There are about 2,100 known moth species of Kenya. The moths (mostly nocturnal) and butterflies (mostly diurnal) together make up the taxonomic order Lepidoptera.

This is a list of moth species which have been recorded in Kenya.

Alucitidae
Alucita dohertyi (Walsingham, 1909)

Anomoeotidae
Anomoeotes elegans Pagenstecher, 1903
Staphylinochrous holotherma Hampson, 1920

Arctiidae
Acantharctia atriramosa Hampson, 1907
Acantharctia bivittata (Butler, 1898)
Acantharctia latifusca (Hampson, 1907)
Acantharctia metaleuca Hampson, 1901
Acantharctia nigrivena Rothschild, 1935
Acantharctia tenuifasciata Hampson, 1910
Acanthofrontia lithosiana Hampson, 1910
Afraloa bifurca (Walker, 1855)
Afrasura hyporhoda (Hampson, 1900)
Afrasura indecisa (Walker, 1869)
Afrasura obliterata (Walker, 1864)
Afrasura peripherica (Strand, 1912)
Afrasura violacea (Cieslak & Häuser, 2006)
Afroarctia kenyana (Rothschild, 1933)
Afrospilarctia lucida (Druce, 1898)
Aglossosia deceptans Hampson, 1914
Aglossosia flavimarginata Hampson, 1900
Alpenus investigatorum (Karsch, 1898)
Alpenus maculosa (Stoll, 1781)
Alpenus nigropunctata (Bethune-Baker, 1908)
Alpenus pardalina (Rothschild, 1910)
Alpenus schraderi (Rothschild, 1910)
Amata alicia (Butler, 1876)
Amata chloroscia (Hampson, 1901)
Amata cholmlei (Hampson, 1907)
Amata congener (Hampson, 1901)
Amata consimilis (Hampson, 1901)
Amata cuprizonata (Hampson, 1901)
Amata dissimilis (Bethune-Baker, 1911)
Amata marinoides Kiriakoff, 1954
Amata phoenicia (Hampson, 1898)
Amata rubritincta (Hampson, 1903)
Amata stenoptera (Zerny, 1912)
Amata williami Rothschild, 1910
Amerila affinis (Rothschild, 1910)
Amerila androfusca (Pinhey, 1952)
Amerila bipartita (Rothschild, 1910)
Amerila brunnea (Hampson, 1901)
Amerila bubo (Walker, 1855)
Amerila luteibarba (Hampson, 1901)
Amerila magnifica (Rothschild, 1910)
Amerila mulleri Häuser & Boppré, 1997
Amerila niveivitrea (Bartel, 1903)
Amerila puella (Fabricius, 1793)
Amerila roseomarginata (Rothschild, 1910)
Amerila thermochroa (Hampson, 1916)
Amerila vidua (Cramer, 1780)
Amerila vitrea Plötz, 1880
Amphicallia pactolicus (Butler, 1888)
Amphicallia solai (Druce, 1907)
Amphicallia thelwalli (Druce, 1882)
Amsacta melanogastra (Holland, 1897)
Amsactarctia pulchra (Rothschild, 1933)
Anaphosia mirabilis (Bartel, 1903)
Anapisa histrio (Kiriakoff, 1953)
Anapisa melaleuca (Holland, 1898)
Anapisa metarctioides (Hampson, 1907)
Apisa canescens Walker, 1855
Apisa fontainei Kiriakoff, 1959
Apisa subargentea Joicey & Talbot, 1921
Archilema dentata Kühne, 2007
Archilema modiolus (Kiriakoff, 1958)
Archilema nivea Kühne, 2007
Archilema uelleburgensis (Strand, 1912)
Argina amanda (Boisduval, 1847)
Asura friederikeae Kühne, 2007
Asura gubunica (Holland, 1893)
Asura mutabilis Kühne, 2007
Asura naumanni Kühne, 2005
Asura pectinella Strand, 1922
Asura spinata Kühne, 2007
Asura spurrelli (Hampson, 1914)
Asurgylla collenettei Kiriakoff, 1958
Automolis pallida (Hampson, 1901)
Balacra compsa (Jordan, 1904)
Balacra flavimacula Walker, 1856
Balacra preussi (Aurivillius, 1904)
Balacra pulchra Aurivillius, 1892
Balacra rattrayi (Rothschild, 1910)
Balacra rubricincta Holland, 1893
Balacra rubrostriata (Aurivillius, 1892)
Binna penicillata Walker, 1865
Carcinarctia laeliodes Hampson, 1916
Carcinarctia metamelaena Hampson, 1901
Caripodia fuscicincta Hampson, 1914
Caripodia persimilis Hampson, 1914
Ceryx crawshayi Hampson, 1901
Ceryx semihyalina Kirby, 1896
Cragia adiastola (Kiriakoff, 1958)
Cragia distigmata (Hampson, 1901)
Cragia quadrinotata (Walker, 1864)
Creatonotos leucanioides Holland, 1893
Ctenosia nephelistis Hampson, 1918
Cyana bigutta Karisch, 2005
Cyana flammeostrigata Karisch, 2003
Cyana margarethae (Kiriakoff, 1958)
Cyana pretoriae (Distant, 1897)
Cyana rejecta (Walker, 1854)
Cyana ugandana (Strand, 1912)
Diota rostrata (Wallengren, 1860)
Disparctia vittata (Druce, 1898)
Eilema aurantisquamata (Hampson, 1918)
Eilema creatoplaga (Hampson, 1901)
Eilema debilissima Kiriakoff, 1958
Eilema flavibasis Hampson, 1900
Eilema gracilipennis (Wallengren, 1860)
Eilema intermixta Kühne, 2007
Eilema leia (Hampson, 1901)
Eilema marwitziana Strand, 1912
Eilema melasonea Hampson, 1903
Eilema mesosticta Hampson, 1911
Eilema peperita (Hampson, 1901)
Eilema polioplaga (Hampson, 1901)
Eilema rufofasciata (Rothschild, 1912)
Eilema sanguicosta (Hampson, 1901)
Eilema tegudentata Kühne, 2007
Epitoxis albicincta Hampson, 1903
Epitoxis ansorgei Rothschild, 1910
Epitoxis procridia Hampson, 1898
Estigmene acrea (Drury, 1773)
Estigmene ansorgei Rothschild, 1910
Estigmene atrifascia (Hampson, 1907)
Estigmene multivittata Rothschild, 1910
Estigmene ochreomarginata Bethune-Baker, 1909
Estigmene tenuistrigata (Hampson, 1900)
Estigmene trivitta (Walker, 1855)
Euchromia amoena (Möschler, 1872)
Euchromia folletii (Guérin-Méneville, 1832)
Eugoa corniculata Kühne, 2007
Eugoa coronaria Kühne, 2007
Eurozonosia atricincta Hampson, 1918
Eurozonosia fulvinigra Hampson, 1914
Exilisia contrasta Kühne, 2007
Exilisia friederikeae Kühne, 2007
Exilisia gablerinus Kühne, 2008
Exilisia kruegeri Kühne, 2007
Exilisia prominentia Kühne, 2007
Eyralpenus scioana (Oberthür, 1880)
Galtara aurivilii (Pagenstecher, 1901)
Galtara elongata (Swinhoe, 1907)
Hippurarctia ferrigera (Druce, 1910)
Ilemodes astriga Hampson, 1916
Ischnarctia cinerea (Pagenstecher, 1903)
Kiriakoffalia costimacula (Joicey & Talbot, 1924)
Lepidilema unipectinata Aurivillius, 1910
Lepista pandula (Boisduval, 1847)
Macrosia chalybeata Hampson, 1901
Mecistorhabdia haematoessa (Holland, 1893)
Meganaclia sippia (Plötz, 1880)
Metarctia benitensis Holland, 1893
Metarctia flavicincta Aurivillius, 1900
Metarctia flavivena Hampson, 1901
Metarctia fulvia Hampson, 1901
Metarctia fusca Hampson, 1901
Metarctia haematica Holland, 1893
Metarctia haematricha Hampson, 1905
Metarctia hypomela Kiriakoff, 1956
Metarctia inconspicua Holland, 1892
Metarctia lateritia Herrich-Schäffer, 1855
Metarctia paremphares Holland, 1893
Metarctia rubripuncta Hampson, 1898
Metarctia rufescens Walker, 1855
Metarctia sarcosoma Hampson, 1901
Metarctia schoutedeni Kiriakoff, 1953
Metarctia subpallens Kiriakoff, 1956
Metarctia unicolor (Oberthür, 1880)
Micralarctia punctulatum (Wallengren, 1860)
Muxta xanthopa (Holland, 1893)
Nanna collinsii Kühne, 2007
Nanna eningae (Plötz, 1880)
Nanna naumanni Kühne, 2005
Neuroxena ansorgei Kirby, 1896
Nyctemera apicalis (Walker, 1854)
Nyctemera glauce (Fawcett, 1916)
Nyctemera itokina (Aurivillius, 1904)
Nyctemera leuconoe Hopffer, 1857
Nyctemera rattrayi (Swinhoe, 1904)
Nyctemera restrictum (Butler, 1894)
Ochrota unicolor (Hopffer, 1857)
Onychipodia nigricostata (Butler, 1894)
Ovenna guineacola (Strand, 1912)
Palaeosiccia honeyi Kühne, 2007
Palaeosiccia punctata Hampson, 1900
Paralacydes arborifera (Butler, 1875)
Paralacydes bivittata (Bartel, 1903)
Paralacydes decemmaculata (Rothschild, 1916)
Paralacydes fiorii (Berio, 1937)
Paralacydes minorata (Berio, 1935)
Paralpenus flavicosta (Hampson, 1909)
Paralpenus ugandae (Hampson, 1916)
Paramaenas nephelistis (Hampson, 1907)
Paramaenas strigosus Grünberg, 1911
Paremonia argentata Hampson, 1914
Pericaliella melanodisca (Hampson, 1907)
Phryganopsis angulifascia (Strand, 1912)
Phryganopsis kinuthiae Kühne, 2007
Phryganopsis parasordida Kühne, 2007
Phryganopsis punctilineata (Hampson, 1901)
Phryganopsis tryphosa Kiriakoff, 1958
Popoudina linea (Walker, 1855)
Popoudina pamphilia Kiriakoff, 1958
Pseudlepista holoxantha Hampson, 1918
Pseudodiptera alberici (Dufrane, 1945)
Pseudonaclia bifasciata Aurivillius, 1910
Pseudonaclia puella (Boisduval, 1847)
Pseudothyretes erubescens (Hampson, 1901)
Pseudothyretes kamitugensis (Dufrane, 1945)
Pseudothyretes nigrita (Kiriakoff, 1961)
Pseudothyretes perpusilla (Walker, 1856)
Pseudothyretes rubicundula (Strand, 1912)
Pusiola chota (Swinhoe, 1885)
Pusiola minutissima (Kiriakoff, 1958)
Pusiola ochreata (Hampson, 1901)
Pusiola poliosia (Kiriakoff, 1958)
Pusiola roscidella (Kiriakoff, 1954)
Pusiola sorghicolor (Kiriakoff, 1954)
Pusiola straminea (Hampson, 1901)
Pusiola tinaeella (Kiriakoff, 1958)
Radiarctia jacksoni (Rothschild, 1910)
Radiarctia lutescens (Walker, 1854)
Radiarctia rhodesiana (Hampson, 1900)
Rhabdomarctia rubrilineata (Bethune-Baker, 1911)
Rhipidarctia crameri Kiriakoff, 1961
Rhipidarctia forsteri (Kiriakoff, 1953)
Rhipidarctia pareclecta (Holland, 1893)
Secusio strigata Walker, 1854
Seydelia ellioti (Butler, 1895)
Siccia adiaphora Kiriakoff, 1958
Siccia anserina Kühne, 2007
Siccia chogoriae Kühne, 2007
Siccia conformis Hampson, 1914
Siccia cretata Hampson, 1914
Siccia duodecimpunctata Kiriakoff, 1958
Siccia elgona Kühne, 2007
Siccia grossagranularis Kühne, 2007
Siccia gypsia Hampson, 1914
Siccia margopuncta Kühne, 2007
Siccia melanospila Hampson, 1911
Siccia orbiculata Kühne, 2007
Siccia pallidata Kühne, 2007
Siccia rarita Kühne, 2007
Siccia ursulae Kühne, 2007
Siccia yvonneae Kühne, 2007
Spilosoma atridorsia Hampson, 1920
Spilosoma baxteri (Rothschild, 1910)
Spilosoma bipartita Rothschild, 1933
Spilosoma clasnaumanni Kühne, 2005
Spilosoma curvilinea Walker, 1855
Spilosoma lineata Walker, 1855
Spilosoma nyasana Rothschild, 1933
Spilosoma pales (Druce, 1910)
Spilosoma rava (Druce, 1898)
Spilosoma sublutescens Kiriakoff, 1958
Spilosoma sulphurea Bartel, 1903
Spilosoma unipuncta (Hampson, 1905)
Stenarctia abdominalis Rothschild, 1910
Stenarctia quadripunctata Aurivillius, 1900
Teracotona abyssinica (Rothschild, 1933)
Teracotona alicia (Hampson, 1911)
Teracotona approximans (Rothschild, 1917)
Teracotona clara Holland, 1892
Teracotona jacksoni (Rothschild, 1910)
Teracotona melanocera (Hampson, 1920)
Teracotona pardalina Bartel, 1903
Teracotona pitmanni Rothschild, 1933
Teracotona rhodophaea (Walker, 1865)
Teracotona subterminata Hampson, 1901
Thumatha africana Kühne, 2007
Thumatha kakamegae Kühne, 2007
Utetheisa amhara Jordan, 1939
Utetheisa pulchella (Linnaeus, 1758)
Zobida trinitas (Strand, 1912)

Autostichidae
Autosticha euryterma Meyrick, 1920

Bombycidae
Racinoa obliquisigna (Hampson, 1910)
Racinoa spiralis Kühne, 2008
Racinoa versicolora Kühne, 2008
Racinoa zolotuhini Kühne, 2008
Vingerhoedtia ruficollis (Strand, 1910)

Brahmaeidae
Dactyloceras lucina (Drury, 1872)
Dactyloceras neumayeri (Pagenstecher, 1885)
Dactyloceras noellae Bouyer, 2006
Dactyloceras ocelligera (Butler, 1889)

Carposinidae
Carposina mesospila Meyrick, 1920

Choreutidae
Anthophila massaicae Agassiz, 2008
Trichocirca tyrota Meyrick, 1920

Coleophoridae
Blastobasis acirfa Adamski, 2010
Blastobasis aynekiella Adamski, 2010
Blastobasis catappaella Adamski, 2010
Blastobasis chuka Adamski, 2010
Blastobasis elgonae Adamski, 2010
Blastobasis glauconotata Adamski, 2010
Blastobasis kenya Adamski, 2010
Blastobasis millicentae Adamski, 2010
Blastobasis mpala Adamski, 2010
Coleophora enchitis Meyrick, 1920
Neoblastobasis laikipiae Adamski, 2010
Neoblastobasis perisella Adamski, 2010
Neoblastobasis wangithiae Adamski, 2010
Neoblastobasis ximeniaella Adamski, 2010

Copromorphidae
Rhynchoferella hoppei Mey, 2007
Rhynchoferella kuehnei Mey, 2007

Cosmopterigidae
Gisilia conformata (Meyrick, 1921)
Gisilia sclerodes (Meyrick, 1909)
Gisilia stereodoxa (Meyrick, 1925)

Cossidae
Nomima chloroptera (Meyrick, 1920)
Strigocossus capensis (Walker, 1856)

Crambidae
Adelpherupa albescens Hampson, 1919
Adelpherupa flavescens Hampson, 1919
Aethaloessa floridalis (Zeller, 1852)
Agathodes musivalis Guenée, 1854
Alphacrambus prodontellus (Hampson, 1919)
Analyta vansomereni Tams, 1932
Anania mesophaealis (Hampson, 1913)
Anania phaeopastalis (Hampson, 1913)
Anania piperitalis (Hampson, 1913)
Ancylolomia atrifasciata Hampson, 1919
Ancylolomia capensis Zeller, 1852
Ancylolomia chrysographellus (Kollar, 1844)
Ancylolomia croesus Hampson, 1919
Ancylolomia perfasciata Hampson, 1919
Ancylolomia planicosta Martin, 1956
Brihaspa chrysostomus (Zeller, 1852)
Cadarena sinuata (Fabricius, 1781)
Caffrocrambus undilineatus (Hampson, 1919)
Calamotropha niveicostellus (Hampson, 1919)
Charltona argyrastis Hampson, 1919
Chilo argyrogramma (Hampson, 1919)
Chilo flavirufalis (Hampson, 1919)
Chilo orichalcociliella (Strand, 1911)
Cotachena smaragdina (Butler, 1875)
Crambus acyperas Hampson, 1919
Crambus hampsoni Błeszyński, 1961
Crambus tessellatus Hampson, 1919
Donacaula rufalis (Hampson, 1919)
Epichilo irroralis (Hampson, 1919)
Euchromius labellum Schouten, 1988
Euclasta gigantalis Viette, 1957
Glaucobotys spiniformis Maes, 2008
Glyphodes capensis (Walker, 1866)
Goniophysetis lactealis Hampson, 1916
Hendecasis apicefulva Hampson, 1916
Hendecasis fulviplaga Hampson, 1916
Lamprophaia ablactalis (Walker, 1859)
Lamprosema ommatalis (Hampson, 1912)
Lygropia amyntusalis (Walker, 1859)
Nausinoe geometralis (Guenée, 1854)
Nomophila noctuella ([Denis & Schiffermüller], 1775)
Orphanostigma abruptalis (Walker, 1859)
Palpita phaealis (Hampson, 1913)
Palpita stenocraspis (Butler, 1898)
Parapoynx diminutalis (Snellen, 1880)
Parerupa africana (Aurivillius, 1910)
Patissa atrilinealis Hampson, 1919
Patissa fractilinealis Hampson, 1919
Patissa geminalis Hampson, 1919
Powysia rosealinea Maes, 2006
Prionapteryx albescens (Hampson, 1919)
Prionapteryx alternalis Maes, 2002
Prionapteryx ochrifasciata (Hampson, 1919)
Prionapteryx rubrifusalis (Hampson, 1919)
Prochoristis calamochroa (Hampson, 1919)
Pycnarmon cribrata (Fabricius, 1794)
Pyrausta bostralis (Hampson, 1919)
Pyrausta centralis Maes, 2009
Pyrausta diatoma Hampson, 1913
Pyrausta flavimarginalis (Hampson, 1913)
Pyrausta haematidalis Hampson, 1913
Pyrausta perfervidalis Hampson, 1913
Pyrausta sanguifusalis Hampson, 1913
Pyrausta sthenialis Hampson, 1916
Syllepte attenualis (Hampson, 1912)
Udeoides muscosalis (Hampson, 1913)
Udeoides nigribasalis (Hampson, 1913)
Udeoides nolalis (Felder & Rogenhofer, 1875)
Udeoides viridis Maes, 2006
Zebronia phenice (Cramer, 1780)

Drepanidae
Epicampoptera andersoni (Tams, 1925)
Epicampoptera marantica (Tams, 1930)
Gonoreta subtilis (Bryk, 1913)

Elachistidae
Elachista brevis Sruoga & De Prins, 2009
Elachista chelonitis Meyrick, 1909
Elachista kakamegensis Sruoga & De Prins, 2009
Elachista longispina Sruoga & De Prins, 2009
Elachista planca Sruoga & De Prins, 2009
Ethmia argomicta Meyrick, 1920
Ethmia ballistis Meyrick, 1908
Ethmia bicolorella (Guenée, 1879)
Ethmia cirrhosoma Meyrick, 1920
Ethmia ditreta Meyrick, 1920
Ethmia epiloxa Meyrick, 1914
Ethmia glabra Meyrick, 1920
Ethmia hemicosma Meyrick, 1920
Ethmia melanocrates Meyrick, 1923
Perittia falciferella Sruoga & De Prins, 2009
Perittia gnoma Sruoga & De Prins, 2009
Perittia spatulata Sruoga & De Prins, 2009
Perittia tantilla Sruoga & De Prins, 2009
Sphecodora porphyrias Meyrick, 1920

Eupterotidae
Acrojana scutaea Strand, 1909
Hoplojana rhodoptera (Gerstaecker, 1871)
Hoplojana roseobrunnea Rothschild, 1917
Jana eurymas Herrich-Schäffer, 1854
Jana fletcheri Berger, 1980
Jana germana Rothschild, 1917
Jana preciosa Aurivillius, 1893
Parajana gabunica (Aurivillius, 1892)
Phiala parabiota Kühne, 2007
Stenoglene obtusus (Walker, 1864)
Stenoglene preussi (Aurivillius, 1893)
Stenoglene roseus (Druce, 1886)
Stenoglene sulphureoides Kühne, 2007
Vianga crowleyi (Aurivillius, 1904)

Galacticidae
Homadaula watamomaritima Mey, 2007

Gelechiidae
Anarsia agricola Walsingham, 1891
Anarsia arsenopa Meyrick, 1920
Chilopselaphus ethicodes Meyrick, 1920
Deltophora angulella Sattler, 1979
Deltophora diversella Sattler, 1979
Encolpotis scioplasta Meyrick, 1920
Gelechia crudescens Meyrick, 1920
Hypatima mangiferae Sattler, 1989
Parallactis plaesiodes (Meyrick, 1920)
Sphenogrypa syncosma Meyrick, 1920
Telphusa microsperma Meyrick, 1920
Telphusa phaulosema Meyrick, 1920
Thiognatha metachalca Meyrick, 1920
Trichotaphe melanosoma Meyrick, 1920

Geometridae
Acanthovalva inconspicuaria (Hübner, 1796)
Acidaliastis bicurvifera Prout, 1916
Acidaliastis micra Hampson, 1896
Acidaliastis subbrunnescens Prout, 1916
Acrostatheusis atomaria (Warren, 1901)
Allochrostes impunctata (Warren, 1897)
Antharmostes papilio Prout, 1912
Aphilopota calaria (Swinhoe, 1904)
Aphilopota cardinalli Prout, 1954
Aphilopota confusata (Warren, 1902)
Aphilopota cydno Prout, 1954
Aphilopota dicampsis Prout, 1934
Aphilopota nubilata Prout, 1954
Aphilopota ochrimacula (Warren, 1902)
Aphilopota rufiplaga (Warren, 1902)
Aphilopota semiusta (Distant, 1898)
Aplochlora pseudossa Prout, 1932
Archichlora jacksoni Carcasson, 1971
Ascotis reciprocaria (Walker, 1860)
Asthenotricha amblycoma Prout, 1935
Asthenotricha anisobapta Prout, 1932
Asthenotricha ansorgei Warren, 1899
Asthenotricha dentatissima Warren, 1899
Asthenotricha flavicoma Warren, 1899
Asthenotricha inutilis Warren, 1901
Asthenotricha pycnoconia Janse, 1933
Asthenotricha semidivisa Warren, 1901
Asthenotricha serraticornis Warren, 1902
Asthenotricha straba Prout, 1921
Asthenotricha strangulata Herbulot, 1953
Asthenotricha unipecten (Prout, 1915)
Biston abruptaria (Walker, 1869)
Biston gloriosaria Karisch, 2005
Biston pteronyma (Prout, 1938)
Cabera andrica Prout, 1932
Cabera pictilinea (Warren, 1902)
Caradrinopsis obscuraria Swinhoe, 1904
Cartaletis libyssa (Hopffer, 1857)
Casilda lucidaria (Swinhoe, 1904)
Casuariclystis latifascia (Walker, 1866)
Centrochria unipunctata Gaede, 1917
Chiasmia amarata (Guenée, 1858)
Chiasmia assimilis (Warren, 1899)
Chiasmia ate (Prout, 1926)
Chiasmia baringensis Agassiz, 2009
Chiasmia brongusaria (Walker, 1860)
Chiasmia butaria (Swinhoe, 1904)
Chiasmia cararia (Swinhoe, 1904)
Chiasmia contaminata (Warren, 1902)
Chiasmia costiguttata (Warren, 1899)
Chiasmia featheri (Prout, 1922)
Chiasmia feraliata (Guenée, 1858)
Chiasmia fulvimargo (Warren, 1899)
Chiasmia geminilinea (Prout, 1932)
Chiasmia inconspicua (Warren, 1897)
Chiasmia maculosa (Warren, 1899)
Chiasmia majestica (Warren, 1901)
Chiasmia marmorata (Warren, 1897)
Chiasmia nubilata (Warren, 1897)
Chiasmia obliquilineata (Warren, 1899)
Chiasmia olindaria (Swinhoe, 1904)
Chiasmia procidata (Guenée, 1858)
Chiasmia semialbida (Prout, 1915)
Chiasmia sororcula (Warren, 1897)
Chiasmia subcurvaria (Mabille, 1897)
Chiasmia sufflata (Guenée, 1858)
Chiasmia trinotata (Warren, 1902)
Chiasmia trizonaria (Hampson, 1909)
Chiasmia umbrata (Warren, 1897)
Chiasmia umbratilis (Butler, 1875)
Chiasmia velia Agassiz, 2009
Chiasmia warreni (Prout, 1915)
Chiasmia zelota Prout, 1922
Chlorerythra rubriplaga Warren, 1895
Chlorissa attenuata (Walker, 1862)
Chlorissa dialeuca Prout, 1930
Chlorissa malescripta (Warren, 1897)
Chloroclystis consocer Prout, 1937
Chloroclystis grisea Warren, 1897
Chloroclystis muscosa (Warren, 1902)
Chloroclystis schoenei Karisch, 2008
Chlorodrepana cryptochroma Prout, 1913
Chrysocraspeda leighata Warren, 1904
Cleora munda (Warren, 1899)
Cleora thyris D. S. Fletcher, 1967
Cleora tulbaghata (Felder & Rogenhofer, 1875)
Coenina aurivena Butler, 1898
Collix foraminata Guenée, 1858
Colocleora bipannosa Prout, 1938
Colocleora proximaria (Walker, 1860)
Comibaena leucospilata (Walker, 1863)
Comostolopsis coerulea Warren, 1902
Comostolopsis simplex Warren, 1902
Conchylia interstincta (Prout, 1923)
Conolophia persimilis (Warren, 1905)
Conolophia rectistrigaria Rebel, 1914
Ctenaulis albirupta Warren, 1902
Cyclophora lyciscaria (Guenée, 1857)
Derambila hyperphyes (Prout, 1911)
Derambila iridoptera (Prout, 1913)
Derambila jacksoni Prout, 1915
Disclisioprocta natalata (Walker, 1862)
Discomiosis anfractilinea Prout, 1915
Discomiosis synnephes Prout, 1915
Dithecodes delicata (Warren, 1899)
Dithecodes ornithospila (Prout, 1911)
Drepanogynis cambogiaria (Guenée, 1858)
Drepanogynis somereni (Prout, 1926)
Dysrhoe olbia (Prout, 1911)
Dysrhoe rhiogyra (Prout, 1932)
Ecpetala animosa Prout, 1935
Ecpetala carnifasciata (Warren, 1899)
Ecpetala indentata (Warren, 1902)
Ecpetala obtusa (Warren, 1902)
Ectropis delosaria (Walker, 1862)
Ectropis ocellata Warren, 1902
Encoma irisaria Swinhoe, 1904
Encoma pulviscula Prout, 1932
Eois alticola (Aurivillius, 1925)
Eois diapsis Prout, 1932
Eois grataria (Walker, 1861)
Epigynopteryx ansorgei (Warren, 1901)
Epigynopteryx coffeae Prout, 1934
Epigynopteryx commixta Warren, 1901
Epigynopteryx flavedinaria (Guenée, 1857)
Epigynopteryx mutabilis (Warren, 1903)
Epirrhoe annulifera (Warren, 1902)
Episteira frustrata Prout, 1935
Erastria albosignata (Walker, 1863)
Erastria leucicolor (Butler, 1875)
Erastria madecassaria (Boisduval, 1833)
Eretmopus anadyomene (Townsend, 1952)
Eretmopus nereis (Townsend, 1952)
Ereunetea reussi Gaede, 1914
Eucrostes disparata Walker, 1861
Eupithecia albistillata Prout, 1932
Eupithecia amphiplex Prout, 1932
Eupithecia anguinata (Warren, 1902)
Eupithecia atomaria (Warren, 1902)
Eupithecia candicans Herbulot, 1988
Eupithecia celatisigna (Warren, 1902)
Eupithecia devestita (Warren, 1899)
Eupithecia dilucida (Warren, 1899)
Eupithecia dohertyi Prout, 1935
Eupithecia ecplyta Prout, 1932
Eupithecia gradatilinea Prout, 1916
Eupithecia hemiochra Prout, 1932
Eupithecia immensa (Warren, 1902)
Eupithecia isotenes Prout, 1932
Eupithecia jeanneli Herbulot, 1953
Eupithecia mecodaedala Prout, 1932
Eupithecia medilunata Prout, 1932
Eupithecia mendosaria (Swinhoe, 1904)
Eupithecia nigribasis (Warren, 1902)
Eupithecia oblongipennis (Warren, 1902)
Eupithecia orbaria (Swinhoe, 1904)
Eupithecia perculsaria (Swinhoe, 1904)
Eupithecia picturata (Warren, 1902)
Eupithecia proflua Prout, 1932
Eupithecia psiadiata Townsend, 1952
Eupithecia regulosa (Warren, 1902)
Eupithecia resarta Prout, 1932
Eupithecia rigida Swinhoe, 1892
Eupithecia rubristigma Prout, 1932
Eupithecia semiflavata (Warren, 1902)
Eupithecia semipallida Janse, 1933
Eupithecia tabacata D. S. Fletcher, 1951
Eupithecia tetraglena Prout, 1932
Eupithecia undiculata Prout, 1932
Exeliopsis tholera (Prout, 1932)
Gonanticlea meridionata (Walker, 1862)
Gymnoscelis acutipennis Warren, 1902
Gymnoscelis birivulata Warren, 1902
Gymnoscelis carneata Warren, 1902
Hemicopsis purpuraria Swinhoe, 1904
Hemidromodes unicolorata Hausmann, 1996
Heterorachis haploa (Prout, 1912)
Heterostegane minutissima (Swinhoe, 1904)
Hierochthonia migrata Prout, 1930
Horisme pallidimacula Prout, 1925
Hydrelia argyridia (Butler, 1894)
Hypomecis assimilis (Warren, 1902)
Idaea fylloidaria (Swinhoe, 1904)
Idaea laciniata (Warren, 1902)
Idaea lalasaria (Swinhoe, 1904)
Idaea lilliputaria (Warren, 1902)
Idaea macrostyla (Warren, 1900)
Idaea minimaria (Warren, 1904)
Idaea parallelaria (Warren, 1902)
Idaea pulveraria (Snellen, 1872)
Idaea subscutulata (Warren, 1899)
Idaea tornivestis (Prout, 1932)
Idaea umbricosta (Prout, 1913)
Idiochlora approximans (Warren, 1897)
Idiochlora subrufibasis (Prout, 1930)
Idiodes flexilinea (Warren, 1898)
Isoplenodia arabukoensis Sihvonen & Staude, 2010
Isturgia catalaunaria (Guenée, 1858)
Isturgia deerraria (Walker, 1861)
Isturgia disputaria (Guenée, 1858)
Isturgia exerraria (Prout, 1925)
Isturgia exospilata (Walker, 1861)
Isturgia presbitaria (Swinhoe, 1904)
Isturgia pulinda (Walker, 1860)
Isturgia quadriplaga (Rothschild, 1921)
Lasiochlora bicolor (Thierry-Mieg, 1907)
Leucoxena lactea Warren, 1900
Lobidiopteryx veninotata Warren, 1902
Lomographa aridata (Warren, 1897)
Lomographa indularia (Guenée, 1858)
Lophorrhachia burdoni Townsend, 1958
Lycaugidia albatus (Swinhoe, 1885)
Melinoessa amplissimata (Walker, 1863)
Melinoessa pauper Warren, 1901
Menophra obtusata (Warren, 1902)
Menophra olginaria (Swinhoe, 1904)
Mesocoela obscura Warren, 1902
Mesocolpia lita (Prout, 1916)
Mesocolpia nanula (Mabille, 1900)
Mesocolpia protrusata (Warren, 1902)
Microloxia ruficornis Warren, 1897
Milocera divorsa Prout, 1922
Milocera podocarpi Prout, 1932
Mimandria cataractae Prout, 1917
Mimoclystia cancellata (Warren, 1899)
Mimoclystia pudicata (Walker, 1862)
Mixocera albistrigata (Pagenstecher, 1893)
Nothofidonia ansorgei (Warren, 1901)
Nothofidonia bicolor Prout, 1915
Oaracta maculata (Warren, 1897)
Obolcola petronaria (Guenée, 1858)
Odontopera acyrthoria (Prout, 1938)
Odontopera breviata (Prout, 1922)
Odontopera curticosta (Prout, 1932)
Odontopera xera (Prout, 1922)
Oedicentra albipennis Warren, 1902
Omizodes rubrifasciata (Butler, 1896)
Omphacodes pulchrifimbria (Warren, 1902)
Omphalucha brunnea (Warren, 1899)
Omphax nigricornis (Warren, 1897)
Omphax plantaria Guenée, 1858
Orbamia octomaculata (Wallengren, 1872)
Oreometra vittata Aurivillius, 1910
Orthonama obstipata (Fabricius, 1794)
Pachypalpella subalbata (Warren, 1900)
Paraptychodes tenuis (Butler, 1878)
Piercia bryophilaria (Warren, 1903)
Piercia fumitacta (Warren, 1903)
Piercia kuehnei Karisch, 2008
Piercia myopteryx Prout, 1935
Piercia pallidifascia Karisch, 2008
Piercia prasinaria (Warren, 1901)
Piercia spatiosata (Walker, 1862)
Piercia subrufaria (Warren, 1903)
Piercia subterlimbata (Prout, 1917)
Piercia subtrunca (Prout, 1932)
Pigiopsis parallelaria Warren, 1902
Pingasa distensaria (Walker, 1860)
Pingasa rhadamaria (Guenée, 1858)
Pingasa ruginaria (Guenée, 1858)
Pitthea trifasciata Dewitz, 1881
Prasinocyma albisticta (Warren, 1901)
Prasinocyma bifimbriata Prout, 1912
Prasinocyma centralis Prout, 1915
Prasinocyma differens (Warren, 1902)
Prasinocyma dohertyi Warren, 1903
Prasinocyma geminata Prout, 1913
Prasinocyma immaculata (Thunberg, 1784)
Prasinocyma leucophracta Prout, 1932
Prasinocyma loveridgei Prout, 1926
Prasinocyma nigrimacula Prout, 1915
Prasinocyma permitis Prout, 1932
Prasinocyma perpulverata Prout, 1916
Prasinocyma pulchraria Swinhoe, 1904
Prasinocyma pupillata (Warren, 1902)
Prasinocyma salutaria (Swinhoe, 1904)
Prasinocyma stictimargo (Warren, 1902)
Prasinocyma tandi Bethune-Baker, 1913
Prasinocyma tricolorifrons (Prout, 1913)
Prasinocyma unipuncta Warren, 1897
Prasinocyma vermicularia (Guenée, 1858)
Problepsis aegretta Felder & Rogenhofer, 1875
Problepsis digammata Kirby, 1896
Problepsis flavistigma Swinhoe, 1904
Prosomphax anomala (Warren, 1902)
Protosteira spectabilis (Warren, 1899)
Pseudochesias neddaria (Swinhoe, 1904)
Pseudolarentia arenaria (Warren, 1902)
Pseudolarentia megalaria (Guenée, 1858)
Pseudolarentia monosticta (Butler, 1894)
Psilocerea cneca Prout, 1932
Psilocerea turpis Warren, 1902
Psilocladia diaereta Prout, 1923
Rheumaptera relicta (Herbulot, 1953)
Rhodometra intervenata Warren, 1902
Rhodometra sacraria (Linnaeus, 1767)
Rhodophthitus commaculata (Warren, 1897)
Rhodophthitus rudicornis (Butler, 1898)
Scardamia maculata Warren, 1897
Scopula accentuata (Guenée, 1858)
Scopula acyma Prout, 1932
Scopula agrapta (Warren, 1902)
Scopula alma Prout, 1920
Scopula argentidisca (Warren, 1902)
Scopula atricapilla Prout, 1934
Scopula bigeminata (Warren, 1897)
Scopula caducaria Swinhoe, 1904
Scopula candidaria (Warren, 1902)
Scopula cassiaria (Swinhoe, 1904)
Scopula cassioides Prout, 1932
Scopula commaria (Swinhoe, 1904)
Scopula crawshayi Prout, 1932
Scopula curvimargo (Warren, 1900)
Scopula dapharia (Swinhoe, 1904)
Scopula dissonans (Warren, 1897)
Scopula erinaria (Swinhoe, 1904)
Scopula fibulata (Guenée, 1857)
Scopula fimbrilineata (Warren, 1902)
Scopula fragilis (Warren, 1903)
Scopula fuscobrunnea (Warren, 1901)
Scopula internata (Guenée, 1857)
Scopula internataria (Walker, 1861)
Scopula isomala Prout, 1932
Scopula longitarsata Prout, 1932
Scopula mesophaena Prout, 1923
Scopula metacosmia Prout, 1932
Scopula minoa (Prout, 1916)
Scopula minorata (Boisduval, 1833)
Scopula natalica (Butler, 1875)
Scopula ocellicincta (Warren, 1901)
Scopula recurvinota (Warren, 1902)
Scopula rufisalsa (Warren, 1897)
Scopula sagittilinea (Warren, 1897)
Scopula sanguinisecta (Warren, 1897)
Scopula sevandaria (Swinhoe, 1904)
Scopula silonaria (Guenée, 1858)
Scopula sinnaria Swinhoe, 1904
Scopula spoliata (Walker, 1861)
Scopula technessa Prout, 1932
Scopula vitiosaria (Swinhoe, 1904)
Scotopteryx nictitaria (Herrich-Schäffer, 1855)
Sesquialtera ridicula Prout, 1916
Somatina ctenophora Prout, 1915
Somatina figurata Warren, 1897
Somatina vestalis (Butler, 1875)
Somatina virginalis Prout, 1917
Sphingomima viriosa Prout, 1915
Syncollesis elegans (Prout, 1912)
Synpelurga innocens (Warren, 1902)
Terina rogersi Prout, 1915
Thalassodes albifimbria Warren, 1897
Thalassodes quadraria Guenée, 1857
Thelycera hemithales (Prout, 1912)
Traminda acuta (Warren, 1897)
Traminda neptunaria (Guenée, 1858)
Traminda ocellata Warren, 1895
Traminda vividaria (Walker, 1861)
Tricentroscelis protrusifrons Prout, 1916
Trimetopia aetheraria Guenée, 1858
Tropicollesis albiceris Prout, 1930
Xanthisthisa fulva (Warren, 1902)
Xanthisthisa nigrocumulata (Warren, 1902)
Xanthisthisa tarsispina (Warren, 1901)
Xanthisthisa tumida (Warren, 1902)
Xanthorhoe ansorgei (Warren, 1899)
Xanthorhoe argenteolineata (Aurivillius, 1910)
Xanthorhoe conchata Warren, 1898
Xanthorhoe exorista Prout, 1922
Xanthorhoe heliopharia (Swinhoe, 1904)
Xanthorhoe poseata (Geyer, 1837)
Xanthorhoe procne (Fawcett, 1916)
Xanthorhoe scarificata Prout, 1932
Xanthorhoe sublesta (Prout, 1932)
Xanthorhoe submaculata (Warren, 1902)
Xanthorhoe tamsi D. S. Fletcher, 1963
Xanthorhoe transcissa (Warren, 1902)
Xanthorhoe transjugata Prout, 1923
Xanthorhoe trientata (Warren, 1901)
Xenimpia angusta Prout, 1915
Xenochroma candidata Warren, 1902
Xylopteryx arcuata (Walker, 1862)
Xylopteryx aucilla Prout, 1926
Xylopteryx bifida Herbulot, 1984
Xylopteryx emunctaria (Guenée, 1858)
Xylopteryx inquilina Agassiz, 2009
Xylopteryx prasinaria Hampson, 1909
Xylopteryx protearia Guenée, 1858
Xylopteryx sima Prout, 1926
Zamarada amicta Prout, 1915
Zamarada ansorgei Warren, 1897
Zamarada bonaberiensis Strand, 1915
Zamarada calypso Prout, 1926
Zamarada chrysopa D. S. Fletcher, 1974
Zamarada collarti Debauche, 1938
Zamarada crystallophana Mabille, 1900
Zamarada cucharita D. S. Fletcher, 1974
Zamarada deceptrix Warren, 1914
Zamarada delosis D. S. Fletcher, 1974
Zamarada delta D. S. Fletcher, 1974
Zamarada dentigera Warren, 1909
Zamarada differens Bastelberger, 1907
Zamarada ekphysis D. S. Fletcher, 1974
Zamarada erosa D. S. Fletcher, 1974
Zamarada erugata D. S. Fletcher, 1974
Zamarada euerces Prout, 1928
Zamarada euphrosyne Oberthür, 1912
Zamarada eurygnathus D. S. Fletcher, 1974
Zamarada excavata Bethune-Baker, 1913
Zamarada hyalinaria (Guenée, 1857)
Zamarada iobathra Prout, 1932
Zamarada keraia D. S. Fletcher, 1974
Zamarada labrys D. S. Fletcher, 1974
Zamarada latilimbata Rebel, 1948
Zamarada longidens D. S. Fletcher, 1963
Zamarada mashariki Aarvik & Bjørnstad, 2007
Zamarada melasma D. S. Fletcher, 1974
Zamarada melpomene Oberthür, 1912
Zamarada mesotaenia Prout, 1931
Zamarada metrioscaphes Prout, 1912
Zamarada ochrata Warren, 1902
Zamarada phaeozona Hampson, 1909
Zamarada plana Bastelberger, 1909
Zamarada pringlei D. S. Fletcher, 1974
Zamarada psammites D. S. Fletcher, 1958
Zamarada psectra D. S. Fletcher, 1974
Zamarada pulverosa Warren, 1895
Zamarada reflexaria (Walker, 1863)
Zamarada rufilinearia Swinhoe, 1904
Zamarada scintillans Bastelberger, 1909
Zamarada secutaria (Guenée, 1858)
Zamarada torrida D. S. Fletcher, 1974
Zamarada townsendi D. S. Fletcher, 1974
Zamarada varii D. S. Fletcher, 1974
Zamarada vigilans Prout, 1915
Zamarada vulpina Warren, 1897
Zeuctoboarmia hyrax (Townsend, 1952)
Zeuctoboarmia translata Prout, 1915
Zygophyxia erlangeri Prout, 1932
Zygophyxia palpata Prout, 1932
Zygophyxia relictata (Walker, 1866)

Gracillariidae
Caloptilia fera Triberti, 1989
Cameraria sokoke de Prins, 2012
Cameraria torridella de Prins, 2012
Conopobathra gravissima (Meyrick, 1912)
Cremastobombycia kipepeo de Prins, 2012
Phyllonorycter achilleus de Prins, 2012
Phyllonorycter acutulus de Prins, 2012
Phyllonorycter agassizi de Prins, 2012
Phyllonorycter albertinus de Prins, 2012
Phyllonorycter grewiaecola (Vári, 1961)
Phyllonorycter grewiaephilos de Prins, 2012
Phyllonorycter grewiella (Vári, 1961)
Phyllonorycter hibiscina (Vári, 1961)
Phyllonorycter hibiscola de Prins, 2012
Phyllonorycter kazuri de Prins, 2012
Phyllonorycter lantanae (Vári, 1961)
Phyllonorycter loxozona (Meyrick, 1936)
Phyllonorycter melanosparta (Meyrick, 1912)
Phyllonorycter mida de Prins, 2012
Phyllonorycter obandai De Prins & Mozuraitis, 2006
Phyllonorycter ocimellus de Prins, 2012
Phyllonorycter ololua de Prins, 2012
Phyllonorycter rongensis de Prins, 2012
Phyllonorycter silvicola de Prins, 2012
Phyllonorycter tsavensis de Prins, 2012
Phyllonorycter turensis de Prins, 2012

Hepialidae
Antihepialus keniae (Holland, 1892)

Lasiocampidae
Anadiasa fuscofasciata (Aurivillius, 1922)
Anadiasa simplex Pagenstecher, 1903
Beralade bettoni Aurivillius, 1905
Beralade convergens Hering, 1932
Beralade pelodes (Tams, 1937)
Beralade sorana Le Cerf, 1922
Bombycomorpha bifascia (Walker, 1855)
Bombycopsis conspersa Aurivillius, 1905
Bombycopsis lepta (Tams, 1931)
Braura elgonensis (Kruck, 1940)
Catalebeda jamesoni (Bethune-Baker, 1908)
Catalebeda tamsi Hering, 1932
Chionopsyche montana Aurivillius, 1909
Chrysopsyche jefferyi Tams, 1926
Chrysopsyche lutulenta Tams, 1923
Cleopatrina bilinea (Walker, 1855)
Cleopatrina phocea (Druce, 1887)
Dasychirinula chrysogramma Hering, 1926
Dollmania flavia (Fawcett, 1915)
Epicnapteroides lobata Strand, 1912
Eucraera decora (Fawcett, 1915)
Eucraera koellikerii (Dewitz, 1881)
Eupagopteryx affinis (Aurivillius, 1909)
Eutricha morosa (Walker, 1865)
Euwallengrenia reducta (Walker, 1855)
Filiola lanceolata (Hering, 1932)
Gelo joannoui Zolotuhin & Prozorov, 2010
Gelo jordani (Tams, 1936)
Gonometa nysa Druce, 1887
Gonometa postica Walker, 1855
Gonometa regia Aurivillius, 1905
Grellada imitans (Aurivillius, 1893)
Lechriolepis griseola Aurivillius, 1927
Lechriolepis ochraceola Strand, 1912
Leipoxais batesi Bethune-Baker, 1927
Leipoxais compsotes Tams, 1937
Leipoxais fuscofasciata Aurivillius, 1908
Leipoxais humfreyi Aurivillius, 1915
Leipoxais marginepunctata Holland, 1893
Leipoxais peraffinis Holland, 1893
Leipoxais proboscidea (Guérin-Méneville, 1832)
Leipoxais rufobrunnea Strand, 1912
Leipoxais siccifolia Aurivillius, 1902
Leipoxais tamsi D. S. Fletcher, 1968
Mallocampa audea (Druce, 1887)
Mallocampa leucophaea (Holland, 1893)
Metajana chanleri Holland, 1896
Mimopacha cinerascens (Holland, 1893)
Mimopacha gerstaeckerii (Dewitz, 1881)
Mimopacha tripunctata (Aurivillius, 1905)
Morongea arnoldi (Aurivillius, 1909)
Morongea lampara Zolotuhin & Prozorov, 2010
Odontocheilopteryx corvus Gurkovich & Zolotuhin, 2009
Odontocheilopteryx foedifragus Gurkovich & Zolotuhin, 2009
Odontocheilopteryx myxa Wallengren, 1860
Odontocheilopteryx pattersoni Tams, 1926
Odontocheilopteryx politzari Gurkovich & Zolotuhin, 2009
Odontocheilopteryx scilla Gurkovich & Zolotuhin, 2009
Odontocheilopteryx spicola Gurkovich & Zolotuhin, 2009
Odontocheilopteryx stokata Gurkovich & Zolotuhin, 2009
Odontogama nigricans Aurivillius, 1914
Opisthodontia budamara Zolotuhin & Prozorov, 2010
Opisthodontia vensani Zolotuhin & Prozorov, 2010
Pachymeta contraria (Walker, 1855)
Pachymeta immunda (Holland, 1893)
Pachymetana guttata (Aurivillius, 1914)
Pachytrina diablo Zolotuhin & Gurkovich, 2009
Pachytrina flamerchena Zolotuhin & Gurkovich, 2009
Pachytrina okzilina Zolotuhin & Gurkovich, 2009
Pachytrina philargyria (Hering, 1928)
Pallastica kakamegata Zolotuhin & Gurkovich, 2009
Pallastica lateritia (Hering, 1928)
Pallastica meloui (Riel, 1909)
Pallastica pallens (Bethune-Baker, 1908)
Pallastica rubinia Zolotuhin & Gurkovich, 2009
Pallastica sericeofasciata (Aurivillius, 1921)
Philotherma jacchus Möschler, 1887
Philotherma sordida Aurivillius, 1905
Pseudolyra despecta (Le Cerf, 1922)
Pseudometa andersoni Tams, 1925
Pseudometa choba (Druce, 1899)
Pseudometa pagetodes Tams, 1929
Sena donaldsoni (Holland, 1901)
Sena prompta (Walker, 1855)
Sena scotti (Tams, 1931)
Sophyrita argibasis (Mabille, 1893)
Stoermeriana callizona Tams, 1931
Stoermeriana cervina (Aurivillius, 1927)
Stoermeriana coilotoma (Bethune-Baker, 1911)
Stoermeriana fusca (Aurivillius, 1905)
Stoermeriana graberi (Dewitz, 1881)
Stoermeriana ocellata Tams, 1929
Stoermeriana sjostedti (Aurivillius, 1902)
Stoermeriana tessmanni (Strand, 1912)
Stoermeriana versicolora Kühne, 2008
Streblote butiti (Bethune-Baker, 1906)
Streblote sodalium (Aurivillius, 1915)
Theophasida kawai Zolotuhin & Prozorov, 2010
Trabala charon Druce, 1910

Lecithoceridae
Eridachtha calamopis Meyrick, 1920
Eridachtha phaeochlora Meyrick, 1920
Lecithocera sceptrarcha Meyrick, 1920

Lemoniidae
Sabalia jacksoni Sharpe, 1890
Sabalia picarina Walker, 1865

Limacodidae
Caffricola kenyensis Talbot, 1932
Casphalia elongata Jordan, 1915
Chrysopoloma crawshayi Aurivillius, 1904
Coenobasis farouki Wiltshire, 1947
Coenobasis postflavida Hampson, 1910
Ctenolita melanosticta (Bethune-Baker, 1909)
Delorhachis kitale West, 1940
Gavara camptogramma Hampson, 1910
Gavara velutina Walker, 1857
Halseyia bisecta (Butler, 1898)
Halseyia similis (Hering, 1937)
Latoia albicosta (Hampson, 1910)
Lembopteris puella Butler, 1898
Macroplectra albescens Hampson, 1910
Macroplectra fuscifusa Hampson, 1910
Macroplectra obliquilinea Hampson, 1910
Narosa nephochloeropis Bethune-Baker, 1909
Niphadolepis auricincta Butler, 1898
Omocena syrtis (Schaus & Clements, 1893)
Parapluda incincta (Hampson, 1909)
Parapluda monogramma (Hampson, 1910)
Scotinocerides conspersa (Kirby, 1896)
Scotinocerides microsticta (Bethune-Baker, 1911)
Scotinochroa inconsequens Butler, 1897
Zinara cymatoides West, 1937

Lymantriidae
Aclonophlebia flavinotata Butler, 1898
Aclonophlebia poecilanthes (Collenette, 1931)
Aclonophlebia triangulifera Hampson, 1910
Aroa discalis Walker, 1855
Aroa incerta Rogenhofer, 1891
Bracharoa mixta (Snellen, 1872)
Bracharoa quadripunctata (Wallengren, 1875)
Carpenterella chionobosca Collenette, 1960
Casama hemippa Swinhoe, 1906
Casama impura (Hering, 1926)
Collenettema crocipes (Boisduval, 1833)
Creagra liturata (Guérin-Méneville, 1844)
Cropera testacea Walker, 1855
Crorema evanescens (Hampson, 1910)
Crorema fuscinotata (Hampson, 1910)
Crorema setinoides (Holland, 1893)
Dasychira aeschra (Hampson, 1926)
Dasychira chorista Hering, 1926
Dasychira gonophoroides Collenette, 1939
Dasychira ilesha Collenette, 1931
Dasychira lulua Collenette, 1937
Dasychira ocellifera (Holland, 1893)
Dasychira punctifera (Walker, 1857)
Dasychira robusta (Walker, 1855)
Dasychira sphaleroides Hering, 1926
Dasychira stegmanni Grünberg, 1910
Dasychira umbricolora Hampson, 1910
Eudasychira calliprepes (Collenette, 1933)
Eudasychira dina (Hering, 1926)
Eudasychira georgiana (Fawcett, 1900)
Eudasychira proleprota (Hampson, 1905)
Euproctis bigutta Holland, 1893
Euproctis confluens Hering, 1926
Euproctis conizona Collenette, 1933
Euproctis consocia Walker, 1865
Euproctis cryphia Collenette, 1960
Euproctis dewitzi (Grünberg, 1907)
Euproctis molunduana Aurivillius, 1925
Euproctis neavei Tams, 1924
Euproctis nessa Swinhoe, 1903
Euproctis nigrifinis (Swinhoe, 1903)
Euproctis pallida (Kirby, 1896)
Euproctis perpusilla Hering, 1926
Euproctis rubricosta Fawcett, 1917
Euproctis sericaria (Tams, 1924)
Euproctis utilis Swinhoe, 1903
Euproctis xanthosoma Hampson, 1910
Griveaudyria ila (Swinhoe, 1904)
Homoeomeria flavicapilla (Wallengren, 1860)
Hyaloperina nudiuscula Aurivillius, 1904
Jacksoniana striata (Collenette, 1937)
Knappetra fasciata (Walker, 1855)
Lacipa albula Fawcett, 1917
Lacipa flavitincta Hampson, 1910
Lacipa florida (Swinhoe, 1903)
Lacipa gracilis Hopffer, 1857
Lacipa impuncta Butler, 1898
Lacipa jefferyi (Collenette, 1931)
Lacipa melanosticta Hampson, 1910
Lacipa ostra (Swinhoe, 1903)
Lacipa sundara (Swinhoe, 1903)
Laelia bifascia Hampson, 1905
Laelia eutricha Collenette, 1931
Laelia extorta (Distant, 1897)
Laelia figlina Distant, 1899
Laelia fracta Schaus & Clements, 1893
Laelia gigantea Hampson, 1910
Laelia gwelila (Swinhoe, 1903)
Laelia lavia Swinhoe, 1903
Laelia rogersi Bethune-Baker, 1913
Leucoma flavifrons (Hampson, 1910)
Leucoma melanochila (Hering, 1926)
Leucoma monosticta (Butler, 1898)
Leucoma parva (Plötz, 1880)
Lymantria hemipyra Collenette, 1932
Lymantria tacita Hering, 1927
Marbla paradoxa (Hering, 1926)
Marblepsis kakamega Collenette, 1937
Marblepsis macrocera (Sharpe, 1890)
Marblepsis tiphia (Swinhoe, 1903)
Mylantria xanthospila (Plötz, 1880)
Naroma nigrolunata Collenette, 1931
Naroma varipes (Walker, 1865)
Neomardara africana (Holland, 1893)
Ogoa simplex Walker, 1856
Olapa fulviceps Hampson, 1910
Olapa tavetensis (Holland, 1892)
Orgyia hopkinsi Collenette, 1937
Palasea arete (Fawcett, 1915)
Palasea conspersa (Hering, 1927)
Palasea gondona (Swinhoe, 1903)
Palasea melia (Fawcett, 1915)
Palasea melissa (Fawcett, 1915)
Paramarbla beni (Bethune-Baker, 1909)
Paramarbla catharia (Collenette, 1933)
Paramarbla lindblomi (Aurivillius, 1921)
Pirga bipuncta Hering, 1926
Pirga loveni Aurivillius, 1921
Pirga magna Swinhoe, 1903
Porthesaroa lacipa Hering, 1926
Porthesaroa noctua Hering, 1926
Pteredoa monosticta (Butler, 1898)
Pteredoa siderea Hering, 1926
Rhodesana mintha Fawcett, 1917
Rhypopteryx diplogramma Hering, 1927
Rhypopteryx hemiphanta Collenette, 1955
Rhypopteryx pachytaenia (Hering, 1926)
Rhypopteryx psoloconiama Collenette, 1960
Rhypopteryx summissa Hering, 1927
Rhypopteryx triangulifera (Hampson, 1910)
Rhypopteryx xuthosticta (Collenette, 1938)
Ruanda eleuteriopsis Hering, 1926
Sphragista kitchingi (Bethune-Baker, 1909)
Stilpnaroma venosa Hering, 1926
Stracena kamengo Collenette, 1936
Stracena promelaena (Holland, 1893)
Stracena striata Schultze, 1934
Stracilla ghesquierei Collenette, 1937
Tamsita habrotima (Tams, 1930)
Tamsita ochthoeba (Hampson, 1920)

Lyonetiidae
Platacmaea cretiseca Meyrick, 1920

Metarbelidae
Aethiopina argentifera Gaede, 1929
Kroonia dallastai Lehmann, 2010
Kroonia natalica (Hampson, 1910)
Lebedodes endomela (Bethune-Baker, 1909)
Lebedodes johni Lehmann, 2008
Lebedodes naevius Fawcett, 1916
Lebedodes velutina Le Cerf, 1914
Metarbela alluaudi Le Cerf, 1914
Metarbela cinereolimbata Le Cerf, 1914
Metarbela dialeuca Hampson, 1910
Metarbela diodonta Hampson, 1916
Metarbela distincta Le Cerf, 1922
Metarbela haberlandorum Lehmann, 1997
Metarbela latifasciata Gaede, 1929
Metarbela nubifera (Bethune-Baker, 1909)
Metarbela pallescens Le Cerf, 1914
Metarbela perstriata Hampson, 1916
Metarbela shimonii Lehmann, 2008
Metarbela simillima (Hampson, 1910)
Metarbelodes obliqualinea (Bethune-Baker, 1909)
Mountelgonia arcifera (Hampson, 1909)
Mountelgonia lumbuaensis Lehmann, 2013
Mountelgonia percivali Lehmann, 2013
Mountelgonia thikaensis Lehmann, 2013
Ortharbela rufula (Hampson, 1910)
Ortharbela tetrasticta (Hampson, 1910)
Paralebedella shimonii Lehmann, 2009
Salagena albonotata (Butler, 1898)
Salagena atridiscata Hampson, 1910
Salagena bennybytebieri Lehmann, 2008
Salagena charlottae Lehmann, 2008
Salagena eustrigata Hampson, 1916
Salagena irrorata Le Cerf, 1914
Salagena narses Fawcett, 1916
Salagena quentinlukei Lehmann, 2008
Salagena tessellata Distant, 1897
Teragra simplicius Le Cerf, 1922
Teragra trimaculata Gaede, 1929

Nepticulidae
Stigmella pelanodes (Meyrick, 1920)

Noctuidae
Abrostola brevipennis (Walker, 1858)
Abrostola confusa Dufay, 1958
Abrostola triopis Hampson, 1902
Achaea catella Guenée, 1852
Achaea finita (Guenée, 1852)
Achaea illustrata Walker, 1858
Achaea lienardi (Boisduval, 1833)
Acontia aarviki Hacker, Legrain & Fibiger, 2008
Acontia albatrigona Hacker, Legrain & Fibiger, 2008
Acontia antica Walker, 1862
Acontia apatelia (Swinhoe, 1907)
Acontia atripars Hampson, 1914
Acontia aurelia Hacker, Legrain & Fibiger, 2008
Acontia basifera Walker, 1857
Acontia binominata (Butler, 1892)
Acontia caeruleopicta Hampson, 1916
Acontia caffraria (Cramer, 1777)
Acontia callima Bethune-Baker, 1911
Acontia carnescens (Hampson, 1910)
Acontia dichroa (Hampson, 1914)
Acontia discoidea Hopffer, 1857
Acontia discoidoides Hacker, Legrain & Fibiger, 2008
Acontia ectorrida (Hampson, 1916)
Acontia goateri Hacker, Legrain & Fibiger, 2010
Acontia guttifera Felder & Rogenhofer, 1874
Acontia hampsoni Hacker, Legrain & Fibiger, 2008
Acontia hausmanni Hacker, 2010
Acontia hemixanthia (Hampson, 1910)
Acontia hoppei Hacker, Legrain & Fibiger, 2008
Acontia hortensis Swinhoe, 1884
Acontia insocia (Walker, 1857)
Acontia leucotrigona (Hampson, 1905)
Acontia mascheriniae (Berio, 1985)
Acontia melaphora (Hampson, 1910)
Acontia miogona (Hampson, 1916)
Acontia natalis (Guenée, 1852)
Acontia niphogona (Hampson, 1909)
Acontia notha Hacker, Legrain & Fibiger, 2010
Acontia nubila Hampson, 1910
Acontia obliqua Hacker, Legrain & Fibiger, 2010
Acontia opalinoides Guenée, 1852
Acontia porphyrea (Butler, 1898)
Acontia purpurata Hacker, Legrain & Fibiger, 2010
Acontia purpureofacta Hacker, Legrain & Fibiger, 2010
Acontia schreieri Hacker, Legrain & Fibiger, 2010
Acontia secta Guenée, 1852
Acontia semialba Hampson, 1910
Acontia sublactea Hacker, Legrain & Fibiger, 2008
Acontia szunyoghyi Hacker, Legrain & Fibiger, 2010
Acontia tanzaniae Hacker, Legrain & Fibiger, 2010
Acontia torrefacta (Distant, 1898)
Acontia trimaculata Aurivillius, 1879
Acontia versicolora Hacker, 2010
Acontia wiltshirei Hacker, Legrain & Fibiger, 2008
Acrapex brunnea Hampson, 1910
Acrapex curvata Hampson, 1902
Acrapex rhabdoneura Hampson, 1910
Adisura atkinsoni Moore, 1881
Aegocera brevivitta Hampson, 1901
Aegocera rectilinea Boisduval, 1836
Agoma trimenii (Felder, 1874)
Agrotana jacksoni Bethune-Baker, 1911
Agrotis biconica Kollar, 1844
Agrotis longidentifera (Hampson, 1903)
Agrotis segetum ([Denis & Schiffermüller], 1775)
Aletia consanguis (Guenée, 1852)
Aletia tincta (Walker, 1858)
Amazonides ascia D. S. Fletcher, 1961
Amazonides epipyria (Hampson, 1903)
Amazonides fuscirufa (Hampson, 1903)
Amazonides griseofusca (Hampson, 1913)
Amazonides ustula (Hampson, 1913)
Amyna axis Guenée, 1852
Amyna magnifoveata Hampson, 1918
Amyna punctum (Fabricius, 1794)
Androlymnia clavata Hampson, 1910
Anoba rufitermina Hampson, 1926
Anoba sinuata (Fabricius, 1775)
Anomis erosa (Hübner, 1818)
Anomis involuta Walker, 1857
Anomis polymorpha Hampson, 1926
Anomis sabulifera (Guenée, 1852)
Apospasta fuscirufa (Hampson, 1905)
Apospasta venata (Hampson, 1905)
Ariathisa abyssinia (Guenée, 1852)
Ariathisa semiluna (Hampson, 1909)
Asota speciosa (Drury, 1773)
Aspidifrontia binagwahoi Laporte, 1978
Aspidifrontia radiata Hampson, 1905
Aspidifrontia sagitta Berio, 1964
Athetis anomoeosis Hampson, 1909
Athetis glauca (Hampson, 1902)
Athetis glaucopis (Bethune-Baker, 1911)
Athetis hyperaeschra Hampson, 1909
Athetis ignava (Guenée, 1852)
Athetis melanosticta Hampson, 1909
Athetis micra (Hampson, 1902)
Athetis nitens (Saalmüller, 1891)
Athetis pigra (Guenée, 1852)
Athetis scotopis (Bethune-Baker, 1911)
Audea fatilega (Felder & Rogenhofer, 1874)
Audea melanoplaga Hampson, 1902
Autoba admota (Felder & Rogenhofer, 1874)
Axylia coniorta (Hampson, 1903)
Bamra glaucopasta (Bethune-Baker, 1911)
Bocula horus (Fawcett, 1916)
Brevipecten calimanii (Berio, 1939)
Brevipecten cornuta Hampson, 1902
Brevipecten marmoreata Hacker & Fibiger, 2007
Brevipecten tessenei Berio, 1939
Calesia zambesita Walker, 1865
Calliodes pretiosissima Holland, 1892
Callopistria latreillei (Duponchel, 1827)
Callopistria maillardi (Guenée, 1862)
Caradrina atriluna Guenée, 1852
Carcharoda flavirosea Hampson, 1910
Carpostalagma pulverulentus Talbot, 1929
Catephia abrostolica Hampson, 1926
Catephia sciras Fawcett, 1916
Catephia metaleuca Hampson, 1926
Catephia scylla Fawcett, 1916
Catephia serapis Fawcett, 1916
Catephia sospita Fawcett, 1916
Cerocala masaica Hampson, 1913
Cerynea endotrichalis Hampson, 1910
Cerynea ignealis Hampson, 1910
Cerynea thermesialis (Walker, 1866)
Chabuata amoeba Hampson, 1905
Chalciope delta (Boisduval, 1833)
Chelecala trefoliata (Butler, 1898)
Chrysodeixis acuta (Walker, [1858])
Chrysodeixis eriosoma (Doubleday, 1843)
Corgatha drepanodes Hampson, 1910
Cortyta canescens Walker, 1858
Cortyta remigiana Hampson, 1913
Crameria amabilis (Drury, 1773)
Cretonia atrisigna Hampson, 1910
Cretonia ethiopica Hampson, 1910
Cryphia leucomelaena (Hampson, 1908)
Crypsotidia maculifera (Staudinger, 1898)
Crypsotidia mesosema Hampson, 1913
Ctenoplusia fracta (Walker, 1857)
Ctenoplusia limbirena (Guenée, 1852)
Ctenoplusia camptogamma (Hampson, 1910)
Cucullia rufescens Hampson, 1906
Cuneisigna cumamita (Bethune-Baker, 1911)
Cuneisigna rivulata (Hampson, 1902)
Cyligramma fluctuosa (Drury, 1773)
Cyligramma latona (Cramer, 1775)
Cyligramma limacina (Guérin-Méneville, 1832)
Dicerogastra proleuca (Hampson, 1913)
Digama africana Swinhoe, 1907
Digama serratula Talbot, 1932
Dysgonia abnegans (Walker, 1858)
Dysgonia angularis (Boisduval, 1833)
Dysgonia erectata (Hampson, 1902)
Dysgonia torrida (Guenée, 1852)
Ectolopha marginata Hampson, 1910
Ectolopha viridescens Hampson, 1902
Egnasia vicaria (Walker, 1866)
Egybolis vaillantina (Stoll, 1790)
Elyptron leucosticta (Hampson, 1909)
Entomogramma pardus Guenée, 1852
Epharmottomena sublimbata Berio, 1894
Epischausia dispar (Rothschild, 1896)
Erebus walkeri (Butler, 1875)
Ericeia congregata (Walker, 1858)
Ericeia inangulata (Guenée, 1852)
Ethiopica hesperonota Hampson, 1909
Ethiopica umbra Le Cerf, 1922
Eublemma anachoresis (Wallengren, 1863)
Eublemma baccalix (Swinhoe, 1886)
Eublemma bicolora Bethune-Baker, 1911
Eublemma brunneosa Bethune-Baker, 1911
Eublemma chlorochroa Hampson, 1910
Eublemma cochylioides (Guenée, 1852)
Eublemma decora (Walker, 1869)
Eublemma exigua (Walker, 1858)
Eublemma flavistriata Hampson, 1910
Eublemma foedosa (Guenée, 1852)
Eublemma gayneri (Rothschild, 1901)
Eublemma hypozonata Hampson, 1910
Eublemma leucozona Hampson, 1910
Eublemma minutoides Poole, 1989
Eublemma nyctichroa Hampson, 1910
Eublemma ornatula (Felder & Rogenhofer, 1874)
Eublemma perobliqua Hampson, 1910
Eublemma psamathea Hampson, 1910
Eublemma ragusana (Freyer, 1844)
Eublemma reducta Butler, 1894
Eublemma roseocincta Hampson, 1910
Eublemma seminivea Hampson, 1896
Eublemma therma Hampson, 1910
Eublemma xanthocraspis Hampson, 1910
Eublemmoides apicimacula (Mabille, 1880)
Eudocima divitiosa (Walker, 1869)
Eudocima materna (Linnaeus, 1767)
Eulocastra aethiops (Distant, 1898)
Eulocastra hypotaenia (Wallengren, 1860)
Euplexia azyga Hampson, 1908
Euplexia chalybsa Hampson, 1908
Euplexia melanocycla Hampson, 1908
Euplexia rhoda Hampson, 1908
Eustrotia amydrozona Hampson, 1910
Eustrotia citripennis Hampson, 1910
Eustrotia cumalinea Bethune-Baker, 1911
Eustrotia decissima (Walker, 1865)
Eustrotia diascia Hampson, 1910
Eustrotia megalena (Mabille, 1900)
Eustrotia melanopis Hampson, 1910
Eustrotia trigonodes Hampson, 1910
Eustrotiopis chlorota Hampson, 1926
Eutelia amatrix Walker, 1858
Eutelia bowkeri (Felder & Rogenhofer, 1874)
Eutelia discitriga Walker, 1865
Eutelia symphonica Hampson, 1902
Euxoa axiliodes Hampson, 1903
Euxootera atrisparsa (Hampson, 1903)
Euxootera melanomesa (Hampson, 1913)
Exathetis strigata (Hampson, 1911)
Feliniopsis africana (Schaus & Clements, 1893)
Feliniopsis connivens (Felder & Rogenhofer, 1874)
Feliniopsis consummata (Walker, 1857)
Feliniopsis duponti (Laporte, 1974)
Feliniopsis nigribarbata (Hampson, 1908)
Feliniopsis opposita (Walker, 1865)
Feliniopsis parvuloides Hacker, 2010
Feliniopsis talhouki (Wiltshire, 1983)
Grammodes congenita Walker, 1858
Grammodes exclusiva Pagenstecher, 1907
Grammodes geometrica (Fabricius, 1775)
Grammodes stolida (Fabricius, 1775)
Hadena bulgeri (Felder & Rogenhofer, 1874)
Hadjina atrinota Hampson, 1909
Heliocheilus cana (Hampson, 1903)
Heliocheilus discalis (Hampson, 1903)
Heliocheilus multiradiata (Hampson, 1902)
Heliocheilus perdentata (Hampson, 1903)
Heliophisma klugii (Boisduval, 1833)
Hemituerta mahdi (Pagenstecher, 1903)
Heraclia africana (Butler, 1875)
Heraclia aisha (Kirby, 1891)
Heraclia flavisignata (Hampson, 1912)
Heraclia gruenbergi (Wichgraf, 1911)
Heraclia hypercompoides (Butler, 1895)
Heraclia karschi (Holland, 1897)
Heraclia monslunensis (Hampson, 1901)
Heraclia nandi Kiriakoff, 1974
Heraclia perdix (Druce, 1887)
Heraclia poggei (Dewitz, 1879)
Heraclia superba (Butler, 1875)
Heraclia thruppi (Butler, 1886)
Heteropalpia robusta Wiltshire, 1988
Honeyia clearchus (Fawcett, 1916)
Hopetounia marginata Hampson, 1926
Hypena obacerralis Walker, 1859
Hypena striolalis Aurivillius, 1910
Hypena vulgatalis Walker, 1859
Hypocala rostrata (Fabricius, 1794)
Hypoperigea medionota Hampson, 1920
Hypopyra africana (Kirby, 1896)
Hypopyra capensis Herrich-Schäffer, 1854
Hypopyra rufescens (Kirby, 1896)
Hypotacha isthmigera Wiltshire, 1968
Hypotacha ochribasalis (Hampson, 1896)
Iambia thwaitesi (Moore, 1885)
Idia pernix (Townsend, 1958)
Janseodes melanospila (Guenée, 1852)
Leucania acrapex (Hampson, 1905)
Leucania bilineata (Hampson, 1905)
Leucania citrinotata (Hampson, 1905)
Leucania clavifera (Hampson, 1907)
Leucania confluens (Bethune-Baker, 1909)
Leucania leucogramma (Hampson, 1905)
Leucania melianoides Möschler, 1883
Leucania nebulosa Hampson, 1902
Leucania pectinata (Hampson, 1905)
Leucania phaea Hampson, 1902
Leucania praetexta Townsend, 1955
Leucania sarca Hampson, 1902
Leucania tacuna Felder & Rogenhofer, 1874
Leucania tenebra (Hampson, 1905)
Leucania usta Hampson, 1902
Lithacodia blandula (Guenée, 1862)
Lophoptera litigiosa (Boisduval, 1833)
Lophorache fulvirufa Hampson, 1910
Lophotidia trisema Hampson, 1913
Marathyssa cuneata (Saalmüller, 1891)
Marca proclinata Saalmüller, 1891
Marcipa carcassoni Pelletier, 1975
Masalia albiseriata (Druce, 1903)
Masalia beatrix (Moore, 1881)
Masalia bimaculata (Moore, 1888)
Masalia disticta (Hampson, 1902)
Masalia fissifascia (Hampson, 1903)
Masalia flavistrigata (Hampson, 1903)
Masalia galatheae (Wallengren, 1856)
Masalia latinigra (Hampson, 1907)
Masalia leucosticta (Hampson, 1902)
Masalia perstriata (Hampson, 1903)
Masalia transvaalica (Distant, 1902)
Matopo actinophora Hampson, 1909
Matopo descarpentriesi (Laporte, 1975)
Maxera marchalii (Boisduval, 1833)
Melanephia endophaea Hampson, 1926
Melanephia nigrescens (Wallengren, 1856)
Mentaxya albifrons (Geyer, 1837)
Mentaxya ignicollis (Walker, 1857)
Mentaxya indigna (Herrich-Schäffer, 1854)
Mentaxya muscosa Geyer, 1837
Mentaxya rimosa (Guenée, 1852)
Metachrostis quinaria (Moore, 1881)
Metappana ethiopica (Hampson, 1907)
Micragrotis acydonta Hampson, 1903
Micragrotis cinerosa Bethune-Baker, 1911
Micragrotis lacteata Hampson, 1903
Mitrophrys ansorgei (Rothschild, 1897)
Mitrophrys menete (Cramer, 1775)
Mocis mayeri (Boisduval, 1833)
Mocis mutuaria (Walker, 1858)
Mocis repanda (Fabricius, 1794)
Mocis undata (Fabricius, 1775)
Mythimna poliastis (Hampson, 1902)
Nodaria externalis Guenée, 1854
Nyodes viridirufa (Hampson, 1918)
Odontestra albivitta Hampson, 1905
Oedicodia limbata Butler, 1898
Oedicodia violascens Hampson, 1910
Oligia ambigua (Walker, 1858)
Omphalestra geraea (Hampson, 1907)
Omphalestra submedianata (Hampson, 1905)
Omphaletis ethiopica Hampson, 1909
Ophiusa finifascia (Walker, 1858)
Oraesia emarginata (Fabricius, 1794)
Oraesia provocans Walker, [1858]
Oraesia wintgensi (Strand, 1909)
Ozarba accincta (Distant, 1898)
Ozarba apicalis Hampson, 1910
Ozarba atrifera Hampson, 1910
Ozarba bipartita (Hampson, 1902)
Ozarba flavescens Hampson, 1910
Ozarba heliastis (Hampson, 1902)
Ozarba hypoxantha (Wallengren, 1860)
Ozarba isocampta Hampson, 1910
Ozarba lepida Saalmüller, 1891
Ozarba megaplaga Hampson, 1910
Ozarba nyanza (Felder & Rogenhofer, 1874)
Ozarba sinua Hampson, 1910
Ozarba terribilis Berio, 1940
Ozarba tricuspis Hampson, 1910
Pandesma robusta (Walker, 1858)
Parachalciope mahura (Felder & Rogenhofer, 1874)
Parachalciope trigonometrica Hampson, 1913
Parafodina pentagonalis (Butler, 1894)
Pericyma atrifusa (Hampson, 1902)
Pericyma mendax (Walker, 1858)
Pericyma metaleuca Hampson, 1913
Phaegorista enarges Tams, 1930
Phaegorista leucomelas (Herrich-Schäffer, 1855)
Photedes homora (Bethune-Baker, 1911)
Phytometra curvifera (Hampson, 1926)
Phytometra magalium (Townsend, 1958)
Phytometra rhodopa (Bethune-Baker, 1911)
Plecoptera approximans Hampson, 1926
Plecoptera diplogramma Hampson, 1926
Plecoptera hypoxantha Hampson, 1926
Plecoptera melanoscia Hampson, 1926
Plecopterodes synethes Hampson, 1913
Plusiodonta basirhabdota Hampson, 1926
Plusiodonta macra Hampson, 1926
Plusiodonta megista Hampson, 1926
Polia atrirena Hampson, 1905
Polydesma umbricola Boisduval, 1833
Prionofrontia nyctiscia Hampson, 1926
Proconis abrostoloides Hampson, 1902
Procriosis albizona Hampson, 1918
Procriosis dileuca Hampson, 1910
Proschaliphora citricostata Hampson, 1901
Pseudcraspedia punctata Hampson, 1898
Pseudomicrodes rufigrisea Hampson, 1910
Pseudozarba mianoides (Hampson, 1893)
Rhabdophera hansali (Felder & Rogenhofer, 1874)
Rhanidophora piguerator Hampson, 1926
Rhesala moestalis (Walker, 1866)
Rhesala punctisigna Hampson, 1926
Rhynchina taruensis Butler, 1898
Rivula lophosoma Hampson, 1926
Rougeotia osellai Berio, 1978
Rougeotia praetexta Townsend, 1956
Sesamia epunctifera Hampson, 1902
Sesamia roseoflammata Pinhey, 1956
Simplicia extinctalis (Zeller, 1852)
Simplicia inflexalis Guenée, 1854
Soloe fumipennis Hampson, 1910
Soloe plicata Pinhey, 1952
Soloella orientis Kühne, 2007
Sommeria culta Hübner, 1831
Sphingomorpha chlorea (Cramer, 1777)
Spodoptera cilium Guenée, 1852
Spodoptera exempta (Walker, 1857)
Spodoptera exigua (Hübner, 1808)
Spodoptera littoralis (Boisduval, 1833)
Spodoptera mauritia (Boisduval, 1833)
Stenosticta grisea Hampson, 1912
Stilbotis basalis (Berio, 1978)
Stilbotis georgyi Laporte, 1984
Stilbotis jouanini Laporte, 1975
Syngrapha circumflexa (Linnaeus, 1767)
Tathorhynchus leucobasis Bethune-Baker, 1911
Thiacidas berenice (Fawcett, 1916)
Thiacidas fasciata (Fawcett, 1917)
Thiacidas fuscomacula Hacker & Zilli, 2010
Thiacidas hampsoni (Hacker, 2004)
Thiacidas orientalis Hacker & Zilli, 2010
Thiacidas permutata Hacker & Zilli, 2007
Thiacidas schausi (Hampson, 1905)
Thiacidas senex (Bethune-Baker, 1911)
Thiacidas smythi (Gaede, 1939)
Thiacidas subhampsoni Hacker & Zilli, 2010
Thiacidas triangulata (Gaede, 1939)
Thyas arcifera (Hampson, 1913)
Thysanoplusia sestertia (Felder & Rogenhofer, 1874)
Timora adamsoni Pinhey, 1956
Toana flaviceps Hampson, 1918
Tolpia atripuncta Hampson, 1926
Tracheplexia lucia (Felder & Rogenhofer, 1974)
Trichoplusia ni (Hübner, [1803])
Trichoplusia orichalcea (Fabricius, 1775)
Trigonodes hyppasia (Cramer, 1779)
Tuerta cyanopasta Hampson, 1907
Tycomarptes inferior (Guenée, 1852)
Tytroca alabuensis Wiltshire, 1970
Ugia albilinea Hampson, 1926
Ulotrichopus eugeniae Saldaitis & Ivinskis, 2010
Ulotrichopus phaeopera Hampson, 1913
Ulotrichopus primulina (Hampson, 1902)
Uncula tristigmatias (Hampson, 1902)
Vietteania torrentium (Guenée, 1852)
Vittaplusia vittata (Wallengren, 1856)
Xanthomera leucoglene (Mabille, 1880)
Zalaca snelleni (Wallengren, 1875)
Zethesides bettoni (Butler, 1898)

Nolidae
Arcyophora dives (Butler, 1898)
Blenina squamifera (Wallengren, 1860)
Bryophilopsis tarachoides Mabille, 1900
Characoma submediana Wiltshire, 1986
Earias biplaga Walker, 1866
Earias cupreoviridis (Walker, 1862)
Earias insulana (Boisduval, 1833)
Eligma laetepicta Oberthür, 1893
Garella nubilosa Hampson, 1912
Giaura leucotis (Hampson, 1905)
Maurilia arcuata (Walker, [1858])
Meganola jacobi Agassiz, 2009
Meganola melanosticta (Hampson, 1914)
Meganola reubeni Agassiz, 2009
Negeta luminosa (Walker, 1858)
Nola chionea Hampson, 1911
Nola diplozona Hampson, 1914
Nola leucalea Hampson, 1907
Nola melaleuca (Hampson, 1901)
Nola melanoscelis (Hampson, 1914)
Nola phaeocraspis (Hampson, 1909)
Nola progonia (Hampson, 1914)
Nycteola malachitis (Hampson, 1912)
Odontestis striata Hampson, 1912
Oedicraspis subfervida Hampson, 1912
Pardasena melanosticta Hampson, 1912
Pardasena roeselioides (Walker, 1858)
Pardasena virgulana (Mabille, 1880)
Risoba diplogramma Hampson, 1912
Risoba obstructa Moore, 1881
Risoba sticticraspis Hampson, 1912
Selepa leucogonia (Hampson, 1905)
Selepa nephelozona (Hampson, 1905)
Xanthodes dinarodes (Hampson, 1912)

Notodontidae
Achaera ochribasis (Hampson, 1910)
Afrocerura leonensis (Hampson, 1910)
Antheua liparidioides (Rothschild, 1910)
Antheua simplex Walker, 1855
Antheua trifasciata (Hampson, 1909)
Antheua woerdeni (Snellen, 1872)
Bisolita rubrifascia (Hampson, 1910)
Clostera solitaria Kiriakoff, 1962
Desmeocraera decorata (Wichgraf, 1922)
Desmeocraera tripuncta Janse, 1920
Epicerura plumosa Kiriakoff, 1962
Epicerura steniptera (Hampson, 1910)
Epidonta eroki Bethune-Baker, 1911
Eulavinia lavinia (Fawcett, 1916)
Eutimia marpissa Wallengren, 1858
Nepheliphora nubifera (Hampson, 1910)
Phalera princei Grünberg, 1909
Polienus capillata (Wallengren, 1875)
Psalisodes atrifasciata Hampson, 1910
Psalisodes discalis (Hampson, 1910)
Psalisodes xylochroa (Hampson, 1910)
Rasemia macrodonta (Hampson, 1909)
Simesia dasychiroides (Butler, 1898)
Stenostaura harperi Agassiz, 2009
Tmetopteryx dorsimaculata Kiriakoff, 1965
Tmetopteryx maura Kiriakoff, 1965
Trotonotus bettoni Butler, 1898
Xanthodonta nigrovittata (Aurivilius, 1921)
Xanthodonta unicornis Kiriakoff, 1961

Oecophoridae
Tortilia rimulata (Meyrick, 1920)

Plutellidae
Genostele fornicata Meyrick, 1920
Paraxenistis africana Mey, 2007
Paraxenistis serrata Mey, 2007
Plutella xylostella (Linnaeus, 1758)

Psychidae
Acanthopsyche calamochroa (Hampson, 1910)
Ctenocompa amydrota Meyrick, 1920
Ctenocompa famula Meyrick, 1920
Melasina hyacinthias Meyrick, 1920
Melasina ichnophora Meyrick, 1920
Melasina olenitis Meyrick, 1914
Melasina spumosa Meyrick, 1920
Melasina stabularia Meyrick, 1908
Melasina varicosa Meyrick, 1920
Narycia acharis Meyrick, 1920
Narycia exalbida Meyrick, 1920
Narycia nubilosa Meyrick, 1920
Typhonia bettoni (Butler, 1898)

Pterophoridae
Agdistis aberdareana Arenberger, 1988
Agdistis kenyana Arenberger, 1988
Agdistis korana Arenberger, 1988
Agdistis linnaei Gielis, 2008
Agdistis malitiosa Meyrick, 1909
Agdistis obstinata Meyrick, 1920
Agdistis riftvalleyi Arenberger, 2001
Amblyptilia direptalis (Walker, 1864)
Apoxyptilus anthites (Meyrick, 1936)
Bipunctiphorus etiennei Gibeaux, 1994
Crassuncus chappuisi Gibeaux, 1994
Emmelina amseli (Bigot, 1969)
Emmelina bigoti Gibeaux, 1990
Emmelina monodactyla (Linnaeus, 1758)
Exelastis atomosa (Walsingham, 1885)
Exelastis caroli Gielis, 2008
Hellinsia conscius (Meyrick, 1920)
Megalorhipida leptomeres (Meyrick, 1886)
Megalorhipida leucodactylus (Fabricius, 1794)
Merrifieldia improvisa Arenberger, 2001
Oxyptilus insomnis (Townsend, 1956)
Picardia eparches (Meyrick, 1931)
Platyptilia aarviki Gielis, 2008
Platyptilia humida Meyrick, 1920
Platyptilia molopias Meyrick, 1906
Platyptilia morophaea Meyrick, 1920
Platyptilia picta Meyrick, 1913
Platyptilia rhyncholoba Meyrick, 1924
Platyptilia sciophaea Meyrick, 1920
Platyptilia thiosoma Meyrick, 1920
Pselnophorus jaechi (Arenberger, 1993)
Pterophorus albidus (Zeller, 1852)
Pterophorus candidalis (Walker, 1864)
Pterophorus cleronoma (Meyrick, 1920)
Pterophorus massai Gielis, 1991
Pterophorus rhyparias (Meyrick, 1908)
Sphenarches anisodactylus (Walker, 1864)
Stenodacma wahlbergi (Zeller, 1852)
Stenoptilia conicephala Gielis, 1990
Stenoptilia ionota Meyrick, 1920
Stenoptilia melanoloncha Meyrick, 1927
Stenoptilia zophodactylus (Duponchel, 1840)
Stenoptilodes taprobanes (Felder & Rogenhofer, 1875)
Titanoptilus melanodonta Hampson, 1905
Walsinghamiella illustris (Townsend, 1958)

Pyralidae
Aglossa fumifusalis Hampson, 1916
Anobostra varians (Butler, 1898)
Ematheudes straminella Snellen, 1872
Endotricha consobrinalis Zeller, 1852
Endotricha ellisoni Whalley, 1963
Endotricha vinolentalis Ragonot, 1891
Lamoria imbella (Walker, 1864)
Mussidia nigrivenella Ragonot, 1888
Paraglossa atrisquamalis Hampson, 1906
Pempelia morosalis (Saalmüller, 1880)
Phycitodes albistriata Hampson, 1917
Pithyllis metachryseis (Hampson, 1906)
Pyralis galactalis Hampson, 1916

Saturniidae
Argema besanti Rebel, 1895
Argema mimosae (Boisduval, 1847)
Aurivillius arata (Westwood, 1849)
Aurivillius seydeli Rougeot, 1962
Bunaea aslauga Kirby, 1877
Bunaeopsis hersilia (Westwood, 1849)
Bunaeopsis jacksoni (Jordan, 1908)
Bunaeopsis licharbas (Maassen & Weymer, 1885)
Bunaeopsis oubie (Guérin-Méneville, 1849)
Campimoptilum boulardi (Rougeot, 1974)
Campimoptilum hollandi (Butler, 1898)
Campimoptilum kuntzei (Dewitz, 1881)
Cinabra hyperbius (Westwood, 1881)
Decachorda aspersa (Felder, 1874)
Decachorda bouvieri Hering, 1929
Decachorda fulvia (Druce, 1886)
Decachorda mombasana Stoneham, 1962
Decachorda rosea Aurivillius, 1898
Eosia digennaroi Bouyer, 2008
Eosia insignis Le Cerf, 1911
Epiphora albidus (Druce, 1886)
Epiphora antinorii (Oberthür, 1880)
Epiphora bauhiniae (Guérin-Méneville, 1832)
Epiphora congolana (Bouvier, 1929)
Epiphora intermedia (Rougeot, 1955)
Epiphora magdalena Grünberg, 1909
Epiphora mythimnia (Westwood, 1849)
Epiphora rectifascia Rothschild, 1907
Gonimbrasia anna (Maassen & Weymer, 1885)
Gonimbrasia conradsi (Rebel, 1906)
Gonimbrasia hoehnelii (Rogenhofer, 1891)
Gonimbrasia occidentalis Rothschild, 1907
Gonimbrasia rectilineata (Sonthonnax, 1899)
Gonimbrasia tyrrhea (Cramer, 1775)
Gonimbrasia wahlbergii (Boisduval, 1847)
Gonimbrasia zambesina (Walker, 1865)
Goodia unguiculata Bouvier, 1936
Gynanisa albescens Sonthonnax, 1904
Gynanisa kenya Darge, 2008
Gynanisa maja (Klug, 1836)
Gynanisa westwoodi Rothschild, 1895
Holocerina angulata (Aurivillius, 1893)
Holocerina istsariensis Stoneham, 1962
Holocerina smilax (Westwood, 1849)
Imbrasia epimethea (Drury, 1772)
Imbrasia ertli Rebel, 1904
Lobobunaea acetes (Westwood, 1849)
Lobobunaea goodi (Holland, 1893)
Lobobunaea jeanneli Rougeot, 1959
Lobobunaea kuehnei Naumann, 2008
Lobobunaea phaedusa (Drury, 1782)
Ludia arguta Jordan, 1922
Ludia delegorguei (Boisduval, 1847)
Ludia dentata (Hampson, 1891)
Ludia hansali Felder, 1874
Ludia orinoptena Karsch, 1892
Ludia pseudovetusta Rougeot, 1978
Melanocera menippe (Westwood, 1849)
Melanocera pinheyi Lemaire & Rougeot, 1974
Melanocera sufferti (Weymer, 1896)
Melanocera widenti Terral & Darge, 1991
Micragone cana (Aurivillius, 1893)
Nudaurelia anthinoides Rougeot, 1978
Nudaurelia belayneshae Rougeot, 1978
Nudaurelia capdevillei Rougeot, 1979
Nudaurelia dione (Fabricius, 1793)
Nudaurelia eblis Strecker, 1876
Nudaurelia emini (Butler, 1888)
Nudaurelia krucki Hering, 1930
Nudaurelia macrothyris (Rothschild, 1906)
Orthogonioptilum adiegetum Karsch, 1892
Pselaphelia flavivitta (Walker, 1862)
Pselaphelia vandenberghei Bouyer, 1992
Pseudaphelia apollinaris (Boisduval, 1847)
Pseudobunaea cleopatra (Aurivillius, 1893)
Pseudobunaea deaconi (Stoneham, 1962)
Pseudobunaea epithyrena (Maassen & Weymer, 1885)
Pseudobunaea irius (Fabricius, 1793)
Pseudobunaea tyrrhena (Westwood, 1849)
Rohaniella pygmaea (Maassen & Weymer, 1885)
Tagoropsis flavinata (Walker, 1865)
Tagoropsis hanningtoni (Butler, 1883)
Tagoropsis rougeoti D. S. Fletcher, 1952
Urota sinope (Westwood, 1849)
Usta angulata Rothschild, 1895
Usta wallengrenii (C. & R. Felder, 1859)
Yatanga smithi (Holland, 1892)

Sesiidae
Camaegeria massai Bartsch & Berg, 2012
Chamanthedon leucocera Hampson, 1919
Homogyna alluaudi Le Cerf, 1911
Lophoceps abdominalis Hampson, 1919
Macrotarsipus albipunctus Hampson, 1893
Macrotarsipus microthyris Hampson, 1919
Melittia amblyphaea Hampson, 1919
Melittia haematopis Fawcett, 1916
Melittia lentistriata Hampson, 1919
Melittia natalensis Butler, 1874
Melittia xanthogaster Hampson, 1919
Paranthrene xanthopyga Hampson, 1919
Synanthedon erythromma Hampson, 1919
Tipulamima pyrosoma Hampson, 1919

Sphingidae
Acanthosphinx guessfeldti (Dewitz, 1879)
Acherontia atropos (Linnaeus, 1758)
Agrius convolvuli (Linnaeus, 1758)
Andriasa contraria Walker, 1856
Antinephele achlora Holland, 1893
Antinephele anomala (Butler, 1882)
Antinephele camerounensis Clark, 1937
Antinephele marcida Holland, 1893
Atemnora westermannii (Boisduval, 1875)
Basiothia aureata (Karsch, 1891)
Basiothia charis (Boisduval, 1875)
Callosphingia circe (Fawcett, 1915)
Centroctena imitans (Butler, 1882)
Centroctena rutherfordi (Druce, 1882)
Ceridia mira Rothschild & Jordan, 1903
Chaerocina dohertyi Rothschild & Jordan, 1903
Chloroclanis virescens (Butler, 1882)
Coelonia fulvinotata (Butler, 1875)
Daphnis nerii (Linnaeus, 1758)
Dovania poecila Rothschild & Jordan, 1903
Ellenbeckia monospila Rothschild & Jordan, 1903
Euchloron megaera (Linnaeus, 1758)
Falcatula falcata (Rothschild & Jordan, 1903)
Hippotion aporodes Rothschild & Jordan, 1912
Hippotion balsaminae (Walker, 1856)
Hippotion chloris Rothschild & Jordan, 1907
Hippotion dexippus Fawcett, 1915
Hippotion eson (Cramer, 1779)
Hippotion irregularis (Walker, 1856)
Hippotion moorei Jordan, 1926
Hippotion osiris (Dalman, 1823)
Hippotion rebeli Rothschild & Jordan, 1903
Hippotion rosae (Butler, 1882)
Hippotion roseipennis (Butler, 1882)
Hippotion socotrensis (Rebel, 1899)
Hippotion stigma (Rothschild & Jordan, 1903)
Leucostrophus alterhirundo d'Abrera, 1987
Likoma apicalis Rothschild & Jordan, 1903
Likoma crenata Rothschild & Jordan, 1907
Lophostethus dumolinii (Angas, 1849)
Macroglossum trochilus (Hübner, 1823)
Macropoliana ferax (Rothschild & Jordan, 1916)
Macropoliana natalensis (Butler, 1875)
Microclanis erlangeri (Rothschild & Jordan, 1903)
Neoclanis basalis (Walker, 1866)
Neopolyptychus compar (Rothschild & Jordan, 1903)
Neopolyptychus serrator (Jordan, 1929)
Nephele accentifera (Palisot de Beauvois, 1821)
Nephele aequivalens (Walker, 1856)
Nephele bipartita Butler, 1878
Nephele comma Hopffer, 1857
Nephele discifera Karsch, 1891
Nephele funebris (Fabricius, 1793)
Nephele monostigma Clark, 1925
Nephele rosae Butler, 1875
Nephele xylina Rothschild & Jordan, 1910
Platysphinx constrigilis (Walker, 1869)
Poliana buchholzi (Plötz, 1880)
Poliana micra Rothschild & Jordan, 1903
Poliana wintgensi (Strand, 1910)
Poliodes roseicornis Rothschild & Jordan, 1903
Polyptychoides digitatus (Karsch, 1891)
Polyptychoides erosus (Jordan, 1923)
Polyptychoides grayii (Walker, 1856)
Polyptychus affinis Rothschild & Jordan, 1903
Praedora leucophaea Rothschild & Jordan, 1903
Praedora marshalli Rothschild & Jordan, 1903
Pseudoclanis kenyae Clark, 1928
Pseudoclanis postica (Walker, 1856)
Rhodafra marshalli Rothschild & Jordan, 1903
Rufoclanis fulgurans (Rothschild & Jordan, 1903)
Rufoclanis numosae (Wallengren, 1860)
Temnora albilinea Rothschild, 1904
Temnora crenulata (Holland, 1893)
Temnora curtula Rothschild & Jordan, 1908
Temnora eranga (Holland, 1889)
Temnora iapygoides (Holland, 1889)
Temnora mirabilis Talbot, 1932
Temnora plagiata Walker, 1856
Temnora pseudopylas (Rothschild, 1894)
Temnora pylades Rothschild & Jordan, 1903
Temnora spiritus (Holland, 1893)
Temnora subapicalis Rothschild & Jordan, 1903
Temnora zantus (Herrich-Schäffer, 1854)
Theretra monteironis (Butler, 1882)
Xanthopan morganii (Walker, 1856)

Thyrididae
Arniocera albiguttata Talbot, 1928
Arniocera amoena Jordan, 1907
Arniocera auriguttata Hopffer, 1857
Arniocera cyanoxantha (Mabille, 1893)
Arniocera ericata Butler, 1898
Arniocera erythropyga (Wallengren, 1860)
Arniocera imperialis Butler, 1898
Arniocera poecila Jordan, 1907
Arniocera sternecki Rogenhofer, 1891
Cecidothyris parobifera Whalley, 1971
Chrysotypus vittiferalis (Gaede, 1917)
Dilophura caudata (Jordan, 1907)
Dysodia fenestratella Warren, 1900
Dysodia fumida Whalley, 1968
Dysodia intermedia (Walker, 1865)
Dysodia lutescens Whalley, 1968
Hapana carcealis Whalley, 1971
Hypolamprus quaesitus Whalley, 1971
Kuja carcassoni Whalley, 1971
Marmax vicaria (Walker, 1854)
Nemea betousalis (Gaede, 1917)
Netrocera basalis Jordan, 1907
Netrocera diffinis Jordan, 1907
Netrocera hemichrysa (Hampson, 1910)
Netrocera setioides Felder, 1874
Striglina minutula (Saalmüller, 1880)

Tineidae
Acridotarsa melipecta (Meyrick, 1915)
Archemitra iorrhoa Meyrick, 1920
Ceratophaga ethadopa (Meyrick, 1938)
Ceratophaga vastellus (Zeller, 1852)
Ceratophaga xanthastis (Meyrick, 1908)
Cylicobathra argocoma (Meyrick, 1914)
Cylicobathra chionarga Meyrick, 1920
Dinica aspirans (Meyrick, 1920)
Edosa crassivalva (Gozmány, 1968)
Edosa melanostoma (Meyrick, 1908)
Erechthias pentatypa (Meyrick, 1920)
Hapsifera glebata Meyrick, 1908
Hapsifera ignobilis Meyrick, 1919
Hapsifera lithocentra Meyrick, 1920
Hapsifera nidicola Meyrick, 1935
Hapsifera ochroptila Meyrick, 1908
Hapsifera pachypsaltis Gozmány, 1965
Hapsifera paraglareosa Gozmány, 1968
Hapsifera revoluta Meyrick, 1914
Hapsifera rhodoptila Meyrick, 1920
Hapsifera septica Meyrick, 1908
Leptozancla talaroscia Meyrick, 1920
Machaeropteris magnifica Gozmány, 1968
Mitrogona laevis Meyrick, 1920
Monopis liparota Meyrick, 1920
Monopis rutilicostella (Stainton, 1860)
Myrmecozela isopsamma Meyrick, 1920
Opogona anisacta Meyrick, 1920
Opogona tanydora Meyrick, 1920
Pachypsaltis pachystoma (Meyrick, 1920)
Pelecystola decorata Meyrick, 1920
Perissomastix breviberbis (Meyrick, 1933)
Perissomastix catapulta Gozmány, 1968
Perissomastix marcescens (Meyrick, 1908)
Perissomastix ruwenzorica Gozmány & Vári, 1973
Phalloscardia semiumbrata (Meyrick, 1920)
Phthoropoea oenochares (Meyrick, 1920)
Pitharcha marmorata Gozmány, 1968
Tiquadra lichenea Walsingham, 1897
Tracheloteina eccephala (Meyrick, 1914)
Wegneria scaeozona (Meyrick, 1920)

Tischeriidae
Coptotriche kenyensis Mey, 2010

Tortricidae
Accra plumbeana Razowski, 1966
Acleris kinangopana Razowski, 1964
Acleris thylacitis (Meyrick, 1920)
Actihema hemiacta (Meyrick, 1920)
Actihema msituni Aarvik, 2010
Actihema simpsonae Aarvik, 2010
Aethes illota (Meyrick, 1914)
Afroploce karsholti Aarvik, 2004
Afroploce turiana Aarvik, 2004
Apotoforma kakamegae Razowski, 2012
Bactra sinassula Diakonoff, 1963
Bactra stagnicolana Zeller, 1852
Cnephasia galeotis Meyrick, 1920
Cnephasia incinerata Meyrick, 1920
Cnephasia melliflua Meyrick, 1914
Cnephasia taganista Meyrick, 1920
Cochylimorpha exoterica (Meyrick, 1924)
Cornesia arabuco Razowski, 2012
Cornesia molytes Razowski, 1993
Cosmorrhyncha acrocosma (Meyrick, 1908)
Cosmorrhyncha microcosma Aarvik, 2004
Crocidosema plebejana Zeller, 1847
Cryptaspasma caryothicta (Meyrick, 1920)
Cryptaspasma phycitinana Aarvik, 2005
Cryptaspasma subtilis Diakonoff, 1959
Ctenopseustis haplodryas Meyrick, 1920
Cydia chrysocosma (Meyrick, 1920)
Cydia leptogramma (Meyrick, 1913)
Eccopsis aegidia (Meyrick, 1932)
Eccopsis agassizi Aarvik, 2004
Eccopsis deprinsi Aarvik, 2004
Eccopsis incultana (Walker, 1863)
Eccopsis nebulana Walsingham, 1891
Eccopsis praecedens Walsingham, 1897
Eccopsis tucki Aarvik, 2004
Eccopsis wahlbergiana Zeller, 1852
Epiblema riciniata (Meyrick, 1911)
Epichorista benevola Meyrick, 1920
Epichorista mesosceptra Meyrick, 1920
Epichorista passaleuta Meyrick, 1920
Epichorista prodigiosa Meyrick, 1920
Epichorista psoropis Meyrick, 1920
Epichoristodes licmaea (Meyrick, 1920)
Eucosma antirrhoa Meyrick, 1920
Eucosma cyphospila Meyrick, 1920
Eucosma inscita Meyrick, 1913
Eucosma metagypsa Meyrick, 1920
Eucosma pharangodes Meyrick, 1920
Eucosma superciliosa Meyrick, 1920
Eugnosta misella Razowski, 1993
Eugnosta percnoptila (Meyrick, 1933)
Eupoecilia kruegeriana Razowski, 1993
Falseuncaria aberdarensis Aarvik, 2010
Fulcrifera halmyris (Meyrick, 1909)
Fulcrifera periculosa (Meyrick, 1913)
Gypsonoma paradelta (Meyrick, 1925)
Leguminovora glycinivorella (Matsumura, 1898)
Lobesia harmonia (Meyrick, 1908)
Megalota archana Aarvik, 2004
Megalota purpurana Aarvik, 2004
Megalota rhopalitis (Meyrick, 1920)
Metamesia elegans (Walsingham, 1881)
Metendothenia balanacma (Meyrick, 1914)
Multiquaestia agassizi Aarvik & Karisch, 2009
Multiquaestia dallastai Aarvik & Karisch, 2009
Olethreutes clavifera (Meyrick, 1920)
Olethreutes nimbosa (Meyrick, 1920)
Orilesa mediocris (Meyrick, 1914)
Panegyra sokokana Razowski, 2012
Paraccra chorogiae Razowski, 2012
Paraeccopsis insellata (Meyrick, 1920)
Phtheochroa aarviki Razowski & J. W. Brown, 2012
Phtheochroa kenyana Aarvik, 2010
Procrica intrepida (Meyrick, 1912)
Procrica parva Razowski, 2002
Sycacantha nereidopa (Meyrick, 1927)
Tortrix chalicodes Meyrick, 1920
Tortrix dinota Meyrick, 1918
Tortrix exedra Meyrick, 1920
Tortrix mitrota Meyrick, 1920
Tortrix poliochra Meyrick, 1920
Tortrix triadelpha Meyrick, 1920
Xenosocia elgonica Karisch, 2008

Uraniidae
Dirades angulifera Warren, 1902
Epiplema carbo Warren, 1902
Epiplema dohertyi Warren, 1904
Epiplema negro Warren, 1901
Epiplema nymphaeata Warren, 1902
Epiplema perpulchra Warren, 1902
Epiplema semipicta Warren, 1904
Heteroplema dependens Warren, 1902
Leucoplema ansorgei (Warren, 1901)
Leucoplema triumbrata (Warren, 1902)
Urapteroides recurvata Warren, 1898

Xyloryctidae
Scythris invisa Meyrick, 1920

Zygaenidae
Astyloneura biplagata (Bethune-Baker, 1911)
Astyloneura cupreitincta (Hampson, 1920)
Astyloneura difformis (Jordan, 1907)
Epiorna abessynica (Koch, 1865)
Saliunca aenescens Hampson, 1920
Saliunca fulviceps Hampson, 1920
Saliunca kamilila Bethune-Baker, 1911
Saliunca meruana Aurivillius, 1910

References

External links 
 

Kenya
Kenya
Moths